

1001–1100 

|-bgcolor=#d6d6d6
| 1001 Gaussia || 1923 OA ||  || August 8, 1923 || Crimea-Simeis || S. Belyavskyj || — || align=right | 73 km || 
|-id=002 bgcolor=#E9E9E9
| 1002 Olbersia || 1923 OB ||  || August 15, 1923 || Crimea-Simeis || V. Albitskij || — || align=right | 23 km || 
|-id=003 bgcolor=#d6d6d6
| 1003 Lilofee || 1923 OK ||  || September 13, 1923 || Heidelberg || K. Reinmuth || THM || align=right | 34 km || 
|-id=004 bgcolor=#d6d6d6
| 1004 Belopolskya || 1923 OS ||  || September 5, 1923 || Crimea-Simeis || S. Belyavskyj || 7:4 || align=right | 72 km || 
|-id=005 bgcolor=#d6d6d6
| 1005 Arago || 1923 OT ||  || September 5, 1923 || Crimea-Simeis || S. Belyavskyj || — || align=right | 61 km || 
|-id=006 bgcolor=#d6d6d6
| 1006 Lagrangea || 1923 OU ||  || September 12, 1923 || Crimea-Simeis || S. Belyavskyj || — || align=right | 35 km || 
|-id=007 bgcolor=#E9E9E9
| 1007 Pawlowia || 1923 OX ||  || October 5, 1923 || Crimea-Simeis || V. Albitskij || slow || align=right | 18 km || 
|-id=008 bgcolor=#d6d6d6
| 1008 La Paz || 1923 PD ||  || October 31, 1923 || Heidelberg || M. F. Wolf || — || align=right | 41 km || 
|-id=009 bgcolor=#FA8072
| 1009 Sirene || 1923 PE ||  || October 31, 1923 || Heidelberg || K. Reinmuth || — || align=right | 6.7 km || 
|-id=010 bgcolor=#d6d6d6
| 1010 Marlene || 1923 PF ||  || November 12, 1923 || Heidelberg || K. Reinmuth || — || align=right | 47 km || 
|-id=011 bgcolor=#FA8072
| 1011 Laodamia || 1924 PK ||  || January 5, 1924 || Heidelberg || K. Reinmuth || — || align=right | 8.4 km || 
|-id=012 bgcolor=#fefefe
| 1012 Sarema || 1924 PM ||  || January 12, 1924 || Heidelberg || K. Reinmuth || — || align=right | 21 km || 
|-id=013 bgcolor=#E9E9E9
| 1013 Tombecka || 1924 PQ ||  || January 17, 1924 || Algiers || B. Jekhovsky || MIT || align=right | 35 km || 
|-id=014 bgcolor=#E9E9E9
| 1014 Semphyra || 1924 PW ||  || January 29, 1924 || Heidelberg || K. Reinmuth || — || align=right | 17 km || 
|-id=015 bgcolor=#d6d6d6
| 1015 Christa || 1924 QF ||  || January 31, 1924 || Heidelberg || K. Reinmuth || — || align=right | 82 km || 
|-id=016 bgcolor=#fefefe
| 1016 Anitra || 1924 QG ||  || January 31, 1924 || Heidelberg || K. Reinmuth || FLOmoon || align=right | 9.5 km || 
|-id=017 bgcolor=#E9E9E9
| 1017 Jacqueline || 1924 QL ||  || February 4, 1924 || Algiers || B. Jekhovsky || — || align=right | 40 km || 
|-id=018 bgcolor=#E9E9E9
| 1018 Arnolda || 1924 QM ||  || March 3, 1924 || Heidelberg || K. Reinmuth || — || align=right | 17 km || 
|-id=019 bgcolor=#fefefe
| 1019 Strackea || 1924 QN ||  || March 3, 1924 || Heidelberg || K. Reinmuth || H || align=right | 7.2 km || 
|-id=020 bgcolor=#E9E9E9
| 1020 Arcadia || 1924 QV ||  || March 7, 1924 || Heidelberg || K. Reinmuth || AGN || align=right | 10 km || 
|-id=021 bgcolor=#E9E9E9
| 1021 Flammario || 1924 RG ||  || March 11, 1924 || Heidelberg || M. F. Wolf || — || align=right | 101 km || 
|-id=022 bgcolor=#E9E9E9
| 1022 Olympiada || 1924 RT ||  || June 23, 1924 || Crimea-Simeis || V. Albitskij || — || align=right | 34 km || 
|-id=023 bgcolor=#d6d6d6
| 1023 Thomana || 1924 RU ||  || June 25, 1924 || Heidelberg || K. Reinmuth || — || align=right | 58 km || 
|-id=024 bgcolor=#d6d6d6
| 1024 Hale ||  ||  || December 2, 1923 || Williams Bay || G. Van Biesbroeck || — || align=right | 43 km || 
|-id=025 bgcolor=#fefefe
| 1025 Riema || 1923 NX ||  || August 12, 1923 || Heidelberg || K. Reinmuth || H || align=right | 4.6 km || 
|-id=026 bgcolor=#fefefe
| 1026 Ingrid || 1923 NY ||  || August 13, 1923 || Heidelberg || K. Reinmuth || FLO || align=right | 7.4 km || 
|-id=027 bgcolor=#d6d6d6
| 1027 Aesculapia ||  ||  || November 11, 1923 || Williams Bay || G. Van Biesbroeck || THM || align=right | 31 km || 
|-id=028 bgcolor=#d6d6d6
| 1028 Lydina || 1923 PG ||  || November 6, 1923 || Crimea-Simeis || V. Albitskij || 7:4 || align=right | 89 km || 
|-id=029 bgcolor=#d6d6d6
| 1029 La Plata || 1924 RK ||  || April 28, 1924 || La Plata Observatory || J. Hartmann || KOR || align=right | 21 km || 
|-id=030 bgcolor=#d6d6d6
| 1030 Vitja || 1924 RQ ||  || May 25, 1924 || Crimea-Simeis || V. Albitskij || — || align=right | 60 km || 
|-id=031 bgcolor=#d6d6d6
| 1031 Arctica || 1924 RR ||  || June 6, 1924 || Crimea-Simeis || S. Belyavskyj || — || align=right | 75 km || 
|-id=032 bgcolor=#d6d6d6
| 1032 Pafuri || 1924 SA ||  || May 30, 1924 || Johannesburg || H. E. Wood || — || align=right | 66 km || 
|-id=033 bgcolor=#d6d6d6
| 1033 Simona || 1924 SM ||  || September 4, 1924 || Williams Bay || G. Van Biesbroeck || EOS || align=right | 19 km || 
|-id=034 bgcolor=#fefefe
| 1034 Mozartia || 1924 SS ||  || September 7, 1924 || Crimea-Simeis || V. Albitskij || — || align=right | 7.9 km || 
|-id=035 bgcolor=#d6d6d6
| 1035 Amata || 1924 SW ||  || September 29, 1924 || Heidelberg || K. Reinmuth || — || align=right | 56 km || 
|-id=036 bgcolor=#FFC2E0
| 1036 Ganymed || 1924 TD ||  || October 23, 1924 || Hamburg-Bergedorf || W. Baade || AMO +1km || align=right | 38 km || 
|-id=037 bgcolor=#fefefe
| 1037 Davidweilla || 1924 TF ||  || October 29, 1924 || Algiers || B. Jekhovsky || FLO || align=right | 6.9 km || 
|-id=038 bgcolor=#d6d6d6
| 1038 Tuckia || 1924 TK ||  || November 24, 1924 || Heidelberg || M. F. Wolf || HIL3:2 || align=right | 58 km || 
|-id=039 bgcolor=#E9E9E9
| 1039 Sonneberga || 1924 TL ||  || November 24, 1924 || Heidelberg || M. F. Wolf || — || align=right | 34 km || 
|-id=040 bgcolor=#d6d6d6
| 1040 Klumpkea || 1925 BD ||  || January 20, 1925 || Algiers || B. Jekhovsky || TIR || align=right | 22 km || 
|-id=041 bgcolor=#d6d6d6
| 1041 Asta || 1925 FA ||  || March 22, 1925 || Heidelberg || K. Reinmuth || — || align=right | 61 km || 
|-id=042 bgcolor=#d6d6d6
| 1042 Amazone || 1925 HA ||  || April 22, 1925 || Heidelberg || K. Reinmuth || slow || align=right | 64 km || 
|-id=043 bgcolor=#d6d6d6
| 1043 Beate || 1925 HB ||  || April 22, 1925 || Heidelberg || K. Reinmuth || — || align=right | 32 km || 
|-id=044 bgcolor=#E9E9E9
| 1044 Teutonia || 1924 RO ||  || May 10, 1924 || Heidelberg || K. Reinmuth || — || align=right | 18 km || 
|-id=045 bgcolor=#fefefe
| 1045 Michela || 1924 TR ||  || November 19, 1924 || Williams Bay || G. Van Biesbroeck || MAS || align=right | 6.1 km || 
|-id=046 bgcolor=#d6d6d6
| 1046 Edwin || 1924 UA ||  || December 1, 1924 || Williams Bay || G. Van Biesbroeck || — || align=right | 29 km || 
|-id=047 bgcolor=#fefefe
| 1047 Geisha || 1924 TE ||  || November 17, 1924 || Heidelberg || K. Reinmuth || FLO || align=right | 11 km || 
|-id=048 bgcolor=#E9E9E9
| 1048 Feodosia || 1924 TP ||  || November 29, 1924 || Heidelberg || K. Reinmuth || — || align=right | 62 km || 
|-id=049 bgcolor=#d6d6d6
| 1049 Gotho || 1925 RB ||  || September 14, 1925 || Heidelberg || K. Reinmuth || — || align=right | 56 km || 
|-id=050 bgcolor=#E9E9E9
| 1050 Meta || 1925 RC ||  || September 14, 1925 || Heidelberg || K. Reinmuth || EUN || align=right | 8.8 km || 
|-id=051 bgcolor=#d6d6d6
| 1051 Merope || 1925 SA ||  || September 16, 1925 || Heidelberg || K. Reinmuth || ALA || align=right | 60 km || 
|-id=052 bgcolor=#fefefe
| 1052 Belgica || 1925 VD ||  || November 15, 1925 || Uccle || E. Delporte || FLOmoon || align=right | 9.8 km || 
|-id=053 bgcolor=#E9E9E9
| 1053 Vigdis || 1925 WA ||  || November 16, 1925 || Heidelberg || M. F. Wolf || — || align=right | 9.1 km || 
|-id=054 bgcolor=#d6d6d6
| 1054 Forsytia || 1925 WD ||  || November 20, 1925 || Heidelberg || K. Reinmuth || — || align=right | 48 km || 
|-id=055 bgcolor=#fefefe
| 1055 Tynka || 1925 WG ||  || November 17, 1925 || Algiers || E. Buchar || FLO || align=right | 13 km || 
|-id=056 bgcolor=#fefefe
| 1056 Azalea || 1924 QD ||  || January 31, 1924 || Heidelberg || K. Reinmuth || FLO || align=right | 12 km || 
|-id=057 bgcolor=#d6d6d6
| 1057 Wanda || 1925 QB ||  || August 16, 1925 || Crimea-Simeis || G. Shajn || — || align=right | 45 km || 
|-id=058 bgcolor=#fefefe
| 1058 Grubba || 1925 MA ||  || June 22, 1925 || Crimea-Simeis || G. Shajn || FLO || align=right | 11 km || 
|-id=059 bgcolor=#E9E9E9
| 1059 Mussorgskia || 1925 OA ||  || July 19, 1925 || Crimea-Simeis || V. Albitskij || — || align=right | 25 km || 
|-id=060 bgcolor=#fefefe
| 1060 Magnolia || 1925 PA ||  || August 13, 1925 || Heidelberg || K. Reinmuth || FLO || align=right | 6.8 km || 
|-id=061 bgcolor=#d6d6d6
| 1061 Paeonia || 1925 TB ||  || October 10, 1925 || Heidelberg || K. Reinmuth || — || align=right | 23 km || 
|-id=062 bgcolor=#d6d6d6
| 1062 Ljuba || 1925 TD ||  || October 11, 1925 || Crimea-Simeis || S. Belyavskyj || — || align=right | 58 km || 
|-id=063 bgcolor=#fefefe
| 1063 Aquilegia || 1925 XA ||  || December 6, 1925 || Heidelberg || K. Reinmuth || — || align=right | 11 km || 
|-id=064 bgcolor=#E9E9E9
| 1064 Aethusa || 1926 PA ||  || August 2, 1926 || Heidelberg || K. Reinmuth || — || align=right | 20 km || 
|-id=065 bgcolor=#FA8072
| 1065 Amundsenia || 1926 PD ||  || August 4, 1926 || Crimea-Simeis || S. Belyavskyj || — || align=right | 11 km || 
|-id=066 bgcolor=#fefefe
| 1066 Lobelia || 1926 RA ||  || September 1, 1926 || Heidelberg || K. Reinmuth || — || align=right | 6.0 km || 
|-id=067 bgcolor=#d6d6d6
| 1067 Lunaria || 1926 RG ||  || September 9, 1926 || Heidelberg || K. Reinmuth || ITH || align=right | 20 km || 
|-id=068 bgcolor=#d6d6d6
| 1068 Nofretete || 1926 RK ||  || September 13, 1926 || Uccle || E. Delporte || — || align=right | 21 km || 
|-id=069 bgcolor=#d6d6d6
| 1069 Planckia || 1927 BC ||  || January 28, 1927 || Heidelberg || M. F. Wolf || — || align=right | 36 km || 
|-id=070 bgcolor=#d6d6d6
| 1070 Tunica || 1926 RB ||  || September 1, 1926 || Heidelberg || K. Reinmuth || — || align=right | 39 km || 
|-id=071 bgcolor=#E9E9E9
| 1071 Brita || 1924 RE ||  || March 3, 1924 || Crimea-Simeis || V. Albitskij || — || align=right | 61 km || 
|-id=072 bgcolor=#d6d6d6
| 1072 Malva || 1926 TA ||  || October 4, 1926 || Heidelberg || K. Reinmuth || — || align=right | 54 km || 
|-id=073 bgcolor=#d6d6d6
| 1073 Gellivara || 1923 OW ||  || September 14, 1923 || Vienna || J. Palisa || THM || align=right | 26 km || 
|-id=074 bgcolor=#d6d6d6
| 1074 Beljawskya || 1925 BE ||  || January 26, 1925 || Crimea-Simeis || S. Belyavskyj || THM || align=right | 49 km || 
|-id=075 bgcolor=#d6d6d6
| 1075 Helina || 1926 SC ||  || September 29, 1926 || Crimea-Simeis || G. N. Neujmin || EOS || align=right | 26 km || 
|-id=076 bgcolor=#fefefe
| 1076 Viola || 1926 TE ||  || October 5, 1926 || Heidelberg || K. Reinmuth || — || align=right | 22 km || 
|-id=077 bgcolor=#fefefe
| 1077 Campanula || 1926 TK ||  || October 6, 1926 || Heidelberg || K. Reinmuth || — || align=right | 9.7 km || 
|-id=078 bgcolor=#fefefe
| 1078 Mentha || 1926 XB ||  || December 7, 1926 || Heidelberg || K. Reinmuth || — || align=right | 13 km || 
|-id=079 bgcolor=#d6d6d6
| 1079 Mimosa || 1927 AD ||  || January 14, 1927 || Williams Bay || G. Van Biesbroeck || KAR || align=right | 21 km || 
|-id=080 bgcolor=#fefefe
| 1080 Orchis || 1927 QB ||  || August 30, 1927 || Heidelberg || K. Reinmuth || — || align=right | 23 km || 
|-id=081 bgcolor=#d6d6d6
| 1081 Reseda || 1927 QF ||  || August 31, 1927 || Heidelberg || K. Reinmuth || — || align=right | 38 km || 
|-id=082 bgcolor=#d6d6d6
| 1082 Pirola || 1927 UC ||  || October 28, 1927 || Heidelberg || K. Reinmuth || THM || align=right | 43 km || 
|-id=083 bgcolor=#fefefe
| 1083 Salvia || 1928 BC ||  || January 26, 1928 || Heidelberg || K. Reinmuth || — || align=right | 8.9 km || 
|-id=084 bgcolor=#E9E9E9
| 1084 Tamariwa || 1926 CC ||  || February 12, 1926 || Crimea-Simeis || S. Belyavskyj || — || align=right | 26 km || 
|-id=085 bgcolor=#d6d6d6
| 1085 Amaryllis || 1927 QH ||  || August 31, 1927 || Heidelberg || K. Reinmuth || — || align=right | 69 km || 
|-id=086 bgcolor=#d6d6d6
| 1086 Nata || 1927 QL ||  || August 25, 1927 || Crimea-Simeis || S. Belyavskyj, N. Ivanov || VER || align=right | 66 km || 
|-id=087 bgcolor=#d6d6d6
| 1087 Arabis || 1927 RD ||  || September 2, 1927 || Heidelberg || K. Reinmuth || EOS || align=right | 37 km || 
|-id=088 bgcolor=#fefefe
| 1088 Mitaka || 1927 WA ||  || November 17, 1927 || Tokyo || O. Oikawa || — || align=right | 15 km || 
|-id=089 bgcolor=#fefefe
| 1089 Tama || 1927 WB ||  || November 17, 1927 || Tokyo || O. Oikawa || moon || align=right | 13 km || 
|-id=090 bgcolor=#fefefe
| 1090 Sumida || 1928 DG ||  || February 20, 1928 || Tokyo || O. Oikawa || — || align=right | 13 km || 
|-id=091 bgcolor=#d6d6d6
| 1091 Spiraea || 1928 DT ||  || February 26, 1928 || Heidelberg || K. Reinmuth || 7:4 || align=right | 35 km || 
|-id=092 bgcolor=#d6d6d6
| 1092 Lilium || 1924 PN ||  || January 12, 1924 || Heidelberg || K. Reinmuth || — || align=right | 40 km || 
|-id=093 bgcolor=#d6d6d6
| 1093 Freda || 1925 LA ||  || June 15, 1925 || Algiers || B. Jekhovsky || — || align=right | 117 km || 
|-id=094 bgcolor=#E9E9E9
| 1094 Siberia || 1926 CB ||  || February 12, 1926 || Crimea-Simeis || S. Belyavskyj || EUN || align=right | 18 km || 
|-id=095 bgcolor=#d6d6d6
| 1095 Tulipa || 1926 GS ||  || April 14, 1926 || Heidelberg || K. Reinmuth || EOS || align=right | 28 km || 
|-id=096 bgcolor=#E9E9E9
| 1096 Reunerta || 1928 OB ||  || July 21, 1928 || Johannesburg || H. E. Wood || — || align=right | 42 km || 
|-id=097 bgcolor=#E9E9E9
| 1097 Vicia || 1928 PC ||  || August 11, 1928 || Heidelberg || K. Reinmuth || slow || align=right | 23 km || 
|-id=098 bgcolor=#E9E9E9
| 1098 Hakone || 1928 RJ ||  || September 5, 1928 || Tokyo || O. Oikawa || — || align=right | 27 km || 
|-id=099 bgcolor=#d6d6d6
| 1099 Figneria || 1928 RQ ||  || September 13, 1928 || Crimea-Simeis || G. N. Neujmin || — || align=right | 23 km || 
|-id=100 bgcolor=#d6d6d6
| 1100 Arnica || 1928 SD ||  || September 22, 1928 || Heidelberg || K. Reinmuth || KOR || align=right | 17 km || 
|}

1101–1200 

|-bgcolor=#d6d6d6
| 1101 Clematis || 1928 SJ ||  || September 22, 1928 || Heidelberg || K. Reinmuth || ALA || align=right | 34 km || 
|-id=102 bgcolor=#d6d6d6
| 1102 Pepita || 1928 VA ||  || November 5, 1928 || Barcelona || J. Comas i Solà || — || align=right | 37 km || 
|-id=103 bgcolor=#fefefe
| 1103 Sequoia || 1928 VB ||  || November 9, 1928 || Hamburg-Bergedorf || W. Baade || H || align=right | 6.7 km || 
|-id=104 bgcolor=#E9E9E9
| 1104 Syringa || 1928 XA ||  || December 9, 1928 || Heidelberg || K. Reinmuth || — || align=right | 23 km || 
|-id=105 bgcolor=#d6d6d6
| 1105 Fragaria || 1929 AB ||  || January 1, 1929 || Heidelberg || K. Reinmuth || EOS || align=right | 38 km || 
|-id=106 bgcolor=#E9E9E9
| 1106 Cydonia || 1929 CW ||  || February 5, 1929 || Heidelberg || K. Reinmuth || EUN || align=right | 12 km || 
|-id=107 bgcolor=#d6d6d6
| 1107 Lictoria || 1929 FB ||  || March 30, 1929 || Pino Torinese || L. Volta || HYG || align=right | 79 km || 
|-id=108 bgcolor=#fefefe
| 1108 Demeter || 1929 KA ||  || May 31, 1929 || Heidelberg || K. Reinmuth || — || align=right | 25 km || 
|-id=109 bgcolor=#d6d6d6
| 1109 Tata || 1929 CU ||  || February 5, 1929 || Heidelberg || K. Reinmuth || HYG || align=right | 62 km || 
|-id=110 bgcolor=#fefefe
| 1110 Jaroslawa || 1928 PD ||  || August 10, 1928 || Crimea-Simeis || G. N. Neujmin || — || align=right | 12 km || 
|-id=111 bgcolor=#d6d6d6
| 1111 Reinmuthia || 1927 CO ||  || February 11, 1927 || Heidelberg || K. Reinmuth || — || align=right | 41 km || 
|-id=112 bgcolor=#d6d6d6
| 1112 Polonia || 1928 PE ||  || August 15, 1928 || Crimea-Simeis || P. F. Shajn || EOS || align=right | 40 km || 
|-id=113 bgcolor=#d6d6d6
| 1113 Katja || 1928 QC ||  || August 15, 1928 || Crimea-Simeis || P. F. Shajn || — || align=right | 45 km || 
|-id=114 bgcolor=#d6d6d6
| 1114 Lorraine || 1928 WA ||  || November 17, 1928 || Nice || A. Schaumasse || — || align=right | 76 km || 
|-id=115 bgcolor=#d6d6d6
| 1115 Sabauda || 1928 XC ||  || December 13, 1928 || Pino Torinese || L. Volta || MEL || align=right | 76 km || 
|-id=116 bgcolor=#d6d6d6
| 1116 Catriona || 1929 GD ||  || April 5, 1929 || Johannesburg || C. Jackson || — || align=right | 39 km || 
|-id=117 bgcolor=#fefefe
| 1117 Reginita || 1927 KA ||  || May 24, 1927 || Barcelona || J. Comas i Solà || — || align=right | 10 km || 
|-id=118 bgcolor=#d6d6d6
| 1118 Hanskya || 1927 QD ||  || August 29, 1927 || Crimea-Simeis || S. Belyavskyj, N. Ivanov || — || align=right | 71 km || 
|-id=119 bgcolor=#E9E9E9
| 1119 Euboea || 1927 UB ||  || October 27, 1927 || Heidelberg || K. Reinmuth || — || align=right | 29 km || 
|-id=120 bgcolor=#fefefe
| 1120 Cannonia || 1928 RV ||  || September 11, 1928 || Crimea-Simeis || P. F. Shajn || FLO || align=right | 10 km || 
|-id=121 bgcolor=#E9E9E9
| 1121 Natascha || 1928 RZ ||  || September 11, 1928 || Crimea-Simeis || P. F. Shajn || — || align=right | 13 km || 
|-id=122 bgcolor=#E9E9E9
| 1122 Neith || 1928 SB ||  || September 17, 1928 || Uccle || E. Delporte || — || align=right | 12 km || 
|-id=123 bgcolor=#fefefe
| 1123 Shapleya || 1928 ST ||  || September 21, 1928 || Crimea-Simeis || G. N. Neujmin || FLO || align=right | 11 km || 
|-id=124 bgcolor=#d6d6d6
| 1124 Stroobantia || 1928 TB ||  || October 6, 1928 || Uccle || E. Delporte || — || align=right | 24 km || 
|-id=125 bgcolor=#d6d6d6
| 1125 China ||  ||  || October 30, 1957 || Nanking || Purple Mountain Obs. || — || align=right | 26 km || 
|-id=126 bgcolor=#fefefe
| 1126 Otero || 1929 AC ||  || January 11, 1929 || Heidelberg || K. Reinmuth || — || align=right | 11 km || 
|-id=127 bgcolor=#E9E9E9
| 1127 Mimi || 1929 AJ ||  || January 13, 1929 || Uccle || S. Arend || — || align=right | 46 km || 
|-id=128 bgcolor=#E9E9E9
| 1128 Astrid || 1929 EB ||  || March 10, 1929 || Uccle || E. Delporte || AST || align=right | 42 km || 
|-id=129 bgcolor=#d6d6d6
| 1129 Neujmina || 1929 PH ||  || August 8, 1929 || Crimea-Simeis || P. Parchomenko || EOS || align=right | 35 km || 
|-id=130 bgcolor=#fefefe
| 1130 Skuld || 1929 RC ||  || September 2, 1929 || Heidelberg || K. Reinmuth || — || align=right | 10 km || 
|-id=131 bgcolor=#FA8072
| 1131 Porzia || 1929 RO ||  || September 10, 1929 || Heidelberg || K. Reinmuth || — || align=right | 7.4 km || 
|-id=132 bgcolor=#E9E9E9
| 1132 Hollandia ||  ||  || September 13, 1929 || Johannesburg || H. van Gent || — || align=right | 27 km || 
|-id=133 bgcolor=#fefefe
| 1133 Lugduna ||  ||  || September 13, 1929 || Johannesburg || H. van Gent || FLO || align=right | 8.3 km || 
|-id=134 bgcolor=#FA8072
| 1134 Kepler || 1929 SA ||  || September 25, 1929 || Heidelberg || M. F. Wolf || — || align=right | 5.9 km || 
|-id=135 bgcolor=#E9E9E9
| 1135 Colchis || 1929 TA ||  || October 3, 1929 || Crimea-Simeis || G. N. Neujmin || — || align=right | 51 km || 
|-id=136 bgcolor=#E9E9E9
| 1136 Mercedes || 1929 UA ||  || October 30, 1929 || Barcelona || J. Comas i Solà || — || align=right | 25 km || 
|-id=137 bgcolor=#fefefe
| 1137 Raïssa || 1929 WB ||  || October 27, 1929 || Crimea-Simeis || G. N. Neujmin || slow || align=right | 19 km || 
|-id=138 bgcolor=#d6d6d6
| 1138 Attica || 1929 WF ||  || November 22, 1929 || Heidelberg || K. Reinmuth || — || align=right | 24 km || 
|-id=139 bgcolor=#FA8072
| 1139 Atami || 1929 XE ||  || December 1, 1929 || Tokyo || O. Oikawa, K. Kubokawa || moon || align=right | 8.9 km || 
|-id=140 bgcolor=#E9E9E9
| 1140 Crimea || 1929 YC ||  || December 30, 1929 || Crimea-Simeis || G. N. Neujmin || — || align=right | 29 km || 
|-id=141 bgcolor=#fefefe
| 1141 Bohmia || 1930 AA ||  || January 4, 1930 || Heidelberg || M. F. Wolf || FLO || align=right | 5.6 km || 
|-id=142 bgcolor=#d6d6d6
| 1142 Aetolia || 1930 BC ||  || January 24, 1930 || Heidelberg || K. Reinmuth || — || align=right | 22 km || 
|-id=143 bgcolor=#C2FFFF
| 1143 Odysseus || 1930 BH ||  || January 28, 1930 || Heidelberg || K. Reinmuth || L4 || align=right | 115 km || 
|-id=144 bgcolor=#d6d6d6
| 1144 Oda || 1930 BJ ||  || January 28, 1930 || Heidelberg || K. Reinmuth || 3:2slow || align=right | 56 km || 
|-id=145 bgcolor=#fefefe
| 1145 Robelmonte || 1929 CC ||  || February 3, 1929 || Uccle || E. Delporte || V || align=right | 24 km || 
|-id=146 bgcolor=#d6d6d6
| 1146 Biarmia || 1929 JF ||  || May 7, 1929 || Crimea-Simeis || G. N. Neujmin || — || align=right | 33 km || 
|-id=147 bgcolor=#fefefe
| 1147 Stavropolis || 1929 LF ||  || June 11, 1929 || Crimea-Simeis || G. N. Neujmin || — || align=right | 13 km || 
|-id=148 bgcolor=#d6d6d6
| 1148 Rarahu || 1929 NA ||  || July 5, 1929 || Crimea-Simeis || A. Deutsch || EOS || align=right | 28 km || 
|-id=149 bgcolor=#d6d6d6
| 1149 Volga || 1929 PF ||  || August 1, 1929 || Crimea-Simeis || E. Skvorcov || — || align=right | 52 km || 
|-id=150 bgcolor=#fefefe
| 1150 Achaia || 1929 RB ||  || September 2, 1929 || Heidelberg || K. Reinmuth || — || align=right | 7.7 km || 
|-id=151 bgcolor=#fefefe
| 1151 Ithaka || 1929 RK ||  || September 8, 1929 || Heidelberg || K. Reinmuth || — || align=right | 12 km || 
|-id=152 bgcolor=#fefefe
| 1152 Pawona || 1930 AD ||  || January 8, 1930 || Heidelberg || K. Reinmuth || — || align=right | 17 km || 
|-id=153 bgcolor=#fefefe
| 1153 Wallenbergia || 1924 SL ||  || September 5, 1924 || Crimea-Simeis || S. Belyavskyj || — || align=right | 8.0 km || 
|-id=154 bgcolor=#d6d6d6
| 1154 Astronomia || 1927 CB ||  || February 8, 1927 || Heidelberg || K. Reinmuth || 7:4 || align=right | 56 km || 
|-id=155 bgcolor=#fefefe
| 1155 Aënna || 1928 BD ||  || January 26, 1928 || Heidelberg || K. Reinmuth || — || align=right | 9.3 km || 
|-id=156 bgcolor=#fefefe
| 1156 Kira || 1928 DA ||  || February 22, 1928 || Heidelberg || K. Reinmuth || — || align=right | 6.8 km || 
|-id=157 bgcolor=#d6d6d6
| 1157 Arabia || 1929 QC ||  || August 31, 1929 || Heidelberg || K. Reinmuth || — || align=right | 29 km || 
|-id=158 bgcolor=#E9E9E9
| 1158 Luda || 1929 QF ||  || August 31, 1929 || Crimea-Simeis || G. N. Neujmin || MAR || align=right | 19 km || 
|-id=159 bgcolor=#fefefe
| 1159 Granada || 1929 RD ||  || September 2, 1929 || Heidelberg || K. Reinmuth || — || align=right | 29 km || 
|-id=160 bgcolor=#E9E9E9
| 1160 Illyria || 1929 RL ||  || September 9, 1929 || Heidelberg || K. Reinmuth || MAR || align=right | 14 km || 
|-id=161 bgcolor=#d6d6d6
| 1161 Thessalia || 1929 SF ||  || September 29, 1929 || Heidelberg || K. Reinmuth || — || align=right | 21 km || 
|-id=162 bgcolor=#d6d6d6
| 1162 Larissa || 1930 AC ||  || January 5, 1930 || Heidelberg || K. Reinmuth || 3:2 || align=right | 40 km || 
|-id=163 bgcolor=#d6d6d6
| 1163 Saga || 1930 BA ||  || January 20, 1930 || Heidelberg || K. Reinmuth || — || align=right | 32 km || 
|-id=164 bgcolor=#fefefe
| 1164 Kobolda || 1930 FB ||  || March 19, 1930 || Heidelberg || K. Reinmuth || PHO || align=right | 7.7 km || 
|-id=165 bgcolor=#d6d6d6
| 1165 Imprinetta || 1930 HM ||  || April 24, 1930 || Johannesburg || H. van Gent || MEL || align=right | 53 km || 
|-id=166 bgcolor=#E9E9E9
| 1166 Sakuntala || 1930 MA ||  || June 27, 1930 || Crimea-Simeis || P. Parchomenko || — || align=right | 26 km || 
|-id=167 bgcolor=#d6d6d6
| 1167 Dubiago || 1930 PB ||  || August 3, 1930 || Crimea-Simeis || E. Skvorcov || 7:4 || align=right | 63 km || 
|-id=168 bgcolor=#E9E9E9
| 1168 Brandia || 1930 QA ||  || August 25, 1930 || Uccle || E. Delporte || EUN || align=right | 10 km || 
|-id=169 bgcolor=#fefefe
| 1169 Alwine || 1930 QH ||  || August 30, 1930 || Heidelberg || M. F. Wolf, M. Ferrero || FLOmoon || align=right | 8.1 km || 
|-id=170 bgcolor=#FA8072
| 1170 Siva || 1930 SQ ||  || September 29, 1930 || Uccle || E. Delporte || PHO || align=right | 10 km || 
|-id=171 bgcolor=#d6d6d6
| 1171 Rusthawelia || 1930 TA ||  || October 3, 1930 || Uccle || S. Arend || — || align=right | 82 km || 
|-id=172 bgcolor=#C2FFFF
| 1172 Äneas || 1930 UA ||  || October 17, 1930 || Heidelberg || K. Reinmuth || L5 || align=right | 118 km || 
|-id=173 bgcolor=#C2FFFF
| 1173 Anchises || 1930 UB ||  || October 17, 1930 || Heidelberg || K. Reinmuth || L5 || align=right | 100 km || 
|-id=174 bgcolor=#d6d6d6
| 1174 Marmara || 1930 UC ||  || October 17, 1930 || Heidelberg || K. Reinmuth || EOS || align=right | 18 km || 
|-id=175 bgcolor=#d6d6d6
| 1175 Margo || 1930 UD ||  || October 17, 1930 || Heidelberg || K. Reinmuth || — || align=right | 24 km || 
|-id=176 bgcolor=#E9E9E9
| 1176 Lucidor || 1930 VE ||  || November 15, 1930 || Uccle || E. Delporte || — || align=right | 17 km || 
|-id=177 bgcolor=#d6d6d6
| 1177 Gonnessia || 1930 WA ||  || November 24, 1930 || Algiers || L. Boyer || 7:4 || align=right | 92 km || 
|-id=178 bgcolor=#E9E9E9
| 1178 Irmela || 1931 EC ||  || March 13, 1931 || Heidelberg || M. F. Wolf || — || align=right | 20 km || 
|-id=179 bgcolor=#E9E9E9
| 1179 Mally || 1931 FD ||  || March 19, 1931 || Heidelberg || M. F. Wolf || — || align=right | 13 km || 
|-id=180 bgcolor=#d6d6d6
| 1180 Rita || 1931 GE ||  || April 9, 1931 || Heidelberg || K. Reinmuth || 3:2 || align=right | 97 km || 
|-id=181 bgcolor=#E9E9E9
| 1181 Lilith || 1927 CQ ||  || February 11, 1927 || Algiers || B. Jekhovsky || — || align=right | 20 km || 
|-id=182 bgcolor=#fefefe
| 1182 Ilona || 1927 EA ||  || March 3, 1927 || Heidelberg || K. Reinmuth || — || align=right | 14 km || 
|-id=183 bgcolor=#fefefe
| 1183 Jutta || 1930 DC ||  || February 22, 1930 || Heidelberg || K. Reinmuth || NYSslow || align=right | 24 km || 
|-id=184 bgcolor=#E9E9E9
| 1184 Gaea || 1926 RE ||  || September 5, 1926 || Heidelberg || K. Reinmuth || AER || align=right | 12 km || 
|-id=185 bgcolor=#fefefe
| 1185 Nikko || 1927 WC ||  || November 17, 1927 || Tokyo || O. Oikawa || FLO || align=right | 8.3 km || 
|-id=186 bgcolor=#d6d6d6
| 1186 Turnera || 1929 PL ||  || August 1, 1929 || Johannesburg || C. Jackson || EOS || align=right | 34 km || 
|-id=187 bgcolor=#E9E9E9
| 1187 Afra || 1929 XC ||  || December 6, 1929 || Heidelberg || K. Reinmuth || — || align=right | 32 km || 
|-id=188 bgcolor=#fefefe
| 1188 Gothlandia || 1930 SB ||  || September 30, 1930 || Barcelona || J. Comas i Solà || FLO || align=right | 13 km || 
|-id=189 bgcolor=#d6d6d6
| 1189 Terentia || 1930 SG ||  || September 17, 1930 || Crimea-Simeis || G. N. Neujmin || TRE || align=right | 59 km || 
|-id=190 bgcolor=#fefefe
| 1190 Pelagia || 1930 SL ||  || September 20, 1930 || Crimea-Simeis || G. N. Neujmin || — || align=right | 18 km || 
|-id=191 bgcolor=#d6d6d6
| 1191 Alfaterna || 1931 CA ||  || February 11, 1931 || Pino Torinese || L. Volta || FIR || align=right | 47 km || 
|-id=192 bgcolor=#fefefe
| 1192 Prisma || 1931 FE ||  || March 17, 1931 || Hamburg-Bergedorf || A. Schwassmann || PHO || align=right | 7.4 km || 
|-id=193 bgcolor=#E9E9E9
| 1193 Africa || 1931 HB ||  || April 24, 1931 || Johannesburg || C. Jackson || EUNslow || align=right | 12 km || 
|-id=194 bgcolor=#d6d6d6
| 1194 Aletta || 1931 JG ||  || May 13, 1931 || Johannesburg || C. Jackson || — || align=right | 41 km || 
|-id=195 bgcolor=#fefefe
| 1195 Orangia || 1931 KD ||  || May 24, 1931 || Johannesburg || C. Jackson || — || align=right | 6.3 km || 
|-id=196 bgcolor=#E9E9E9
| 1196 Sheba || 1931 KE ||  || May 21, 1931 || Johannesburg || C. Jackson || — || align=right | 25 km || 
|-id=197 bgcolor=#d6d6d6
| 1197 Rhodesia || 1931 LD ||  || June 9, 1931 || Johannesburg || C. Jackson || — || align=right | 48 km || 
|-id=198 bgcolor=#FA8072
| 1198 Atlantis || 1931 RA ||  || September 7, 1931 || Heidelberg || K. Reinmuth || — || align=right | 3.9 km || 
|-id=199 bgcolor=#d6d6d6
| 1199 Geldonia || 1931 RF ||  || September 14, 1931 || Uccle || E. Delporte || EOS || align=right | 30 km || 
|-id=200 bgcolor=#d6d6d6
| 1200 Imperatrix || 1931 RH ||  || September 14, 1931 || Heidelberg || K. Reinmuth || HYG || align=right | 42 km || 
|}

1201–1300 

|-bgcolor=#E9E9E9
| 1201 Strenua || 1931 RK ||  || September 14, 1931 || Heidelberg || K. Reinmuth || — || align=right | 36 km || 
|-id=202 bgcolor=#d6d6d6
| 1202 Marina || 1931 RL ||  || September 13, 1931 || Crimea-Simeis || G. N. Neujmin || 3:2 || align=right | 55 km || 
|-id=203 bgcolor=#d6d6d6
| 1203 Nanna || 1931 TA ||  || October 5, 1931 || Heidelberg || M. F. Wolf || — || align=right | 35 km || 
|-id=204 bgcolor=#FA8072
| 1204 Renzia || 1931 TE ||  || October 6, 1931 || Heidelberg || K. Reinmuth || — || align=right | 12 km || 
|-id=205 bgcolor=#E9E9E9
| 1205 Ebella ||  ||  || October 6, 1931 || Heidelberg || K. Reinmuth || — || align=right | 5.5 km || 
|-id=206 bgcolor=#d6d6d6
| 1206 Numerowia || 1931 UH ||  || October 18, 1931 || Heidelberg || K. Reinmuth || — || align=right | 15 km || 
|-id=207 bgcolor=#d6d6d6
| 1207 Ostenia || 1931 VT ||  || November 15, 1931 || Heidelberg || K. Reinmuth || EOS || align=right | 22 km || 
|-id=208 bgcolor=#C2FFFF
| 1208 Troilus || 1931 YA ||  || December 31, 1931 || Heidelberg || K. Reinmuth || L5 || align=right | 100 km || 
|-id=209 bgcolor=#d6d6d6
| 1209 Pumma || 1927 HA ||  || April 22, 1927 || Heidelberg || K. Reinmuth || HYG || align=right | 27 km || 
|-id=210 bgcolor=#d6d6d6
| 1210 Morosovia || 1931 LB ||  || June 6, 1931 || Crimea-Simeis || G. N. Neujmin || EOS || align=right | 34 km || 
|-id=211 bgcolor=#d6d6d6
| 1211 Bressole || 1931 XA ||  || December 2, 1931 || Algiers || L. Boyer || — || align=right | 46 km || 
|-id=212 bgcolor=#d6d6d6
| 1212 Francette || 1931 XC ||  || December 3, 1931 || Algiers || L. Boyer || HIL3:2 || align=right | 76 km || 
|-id=213 bgcolor=#d6d6d6
| 1213 Algeria || 1931 XD ||  || December 5, 1931 || Algiers || G. Reiss || — || align=right | 29 km || 
|-id=214 bgcolor=#E9E9E9
| 1214 Richilde || 1932 AA ||  || January 1, 1932 || Heidelberg || M. F. Wolf || — || align=right | 37 km || 
|-id=215 bgcolor=#E9E9E9
| 1215 Boyer || 1932 BA ||  || January 19, 1932 || Algiers || A. Schmitt || — || align=right | 13 km || 
|-id=216 bgcolor=#fefefe
| 1216 Askania || 1932 BL ||  || January 29, 1932 || Heidelberg || K. Reinmuth || — || align=right | 11 km || 
|-id=217 bgcolor=#fefefe
| 1217 Maximiliana || 1932 EC ||  || March 13, 1932 || Uccle || E. Delporte || — || align=right | 8.5 km || 
|-id=218 bgcolor=#fefefe
| 1218 Aster || 1932 BJ ||  || January 29, 1932 || Heidelberg || K. Reinmuth || — || align=right | 5.6 km || 
|-id=219 bgcolor=#fefefe
| 1219 Britta || 1932 CJ ||  || February 6, 1932 || Heidelberg || M. F. Wolf || — || align=right | 9.9 km || 
|-id=220 bgcolor=#d6d6d6
| 1220 Crocus || 1932 CU ||  || February 11, 1932 || Heidelberg || K. Reinmuth || EOSslow || align=right | 18 km || 
|-id=221 bgcolor=#FFC2E0
| 1221 Amor ||  ||  || March 12, 1932 || Uccle || E. Delporte || AMO +1km || align=right | 1.0 km || 
|-id=222 bgcolor=#E9E9E9
| 1222 Tina || 1932 LA ||  || June 11, 1932 || Uccle || E. Delporte || TIN || align=right | 26 km || 
|-id=223 bgcolor=#d6d6d6
| 1223 Neckar || 1931 TG ||  || October 6, 1931 || Heidelberg || K. Reinmuth || KOR || align=right | 23 km || 
|-id=224 bgcolor=#fefefe
| 1224 Fantasia || 1927 SD ||  || August 29, 1927 || Crimea-Simeis || S. Belyavskyj, N. Ivanov || — || align=right | 14 km || 
|-id=225 bgcolor=#fefefe
| 1225 Ariane || 1930 HK ||  || April 23, 1930 || Johannesburg || H. van Gent || — || align=right | 9.2 km || 
|-id=226 bgcolor=#E9E9E9
| 1226 Golia || 1930 HL ||  || April 22, 1930 || Johannesburg || H. van Gent || — || align=right | 12 km || 
|-id=227 bgcolor=#d6d6d6
| 1227 Geranium || 1931 TD ||  || October 5, 1931 || Heidelberg || K. Reinmuth || — || align=right | 46 km || 
|-id=228 bgcolor=#E9E9E9
| 1228 Scabiosa || 1931 TU ||  || October 5, 1931 || Heidelberg || K. Reinmuth || — || align=right | 15 km || 
|-id=229 bgcolor=#d6d6d6
| 1229 Tilia ||  ||  || October 9, 1931 || Heidelberg || K. Reinmuth || THM || align=right | 28 km || 
|-id=230 bgcolor=#E9E9E9
| 1230 Riceia ||  ||  || October 9, 1931 || Heidelberg || K. Reinmuth || — || align=right | 6.2 km || 
|-id=231 bgcolor=#E9E9E9
| 1231 Auricula ||  ||  || October 10, 1931 || Heidelberg || K. Reinmuth || — || align=right | 19 km || 
|-id=232 bgcolor=#d6d6d6
| 1232 Cortusa ||  ||  || October 10, 1931 || Heidelberg || K. Reinmuth || — || align=right | 36 km || 
|-id=233 bgcolor=#E9E9E9
| 1233 Kobresia ||  ||  || October 10, 1931 || Heidelberg || K. Reinmuth || — || align=right | 33 km || 
|-id=234 bgcolor=#d6d6d6
| 1234 Elyna || 1931 UF ||  || October 18, 1931 || Heidelberg || K. Reinmuth || EOS || align=right | 23 km || 
|-id=235 bgcolor=#FA8072
| 1235 Schorria || 1931 UJ ||  || October 18, 1931 || Heidelberg || K. Reinmuth || Hslow || align=right | 6.8 km || 
|-id=236 bgcolor=#fefefe
| 1236 Thaïs || 1931 VX ||  || November 6, 1931 || Crimea-Simeis || G. N. Neujmin || — || align=right | 22 km || 
|-id=237 bgcolor=#E9E9E9
| 1237 Geneviève || 1931 XB ||  || December 2, 1931 || Algiers || G. Reiss || — || align=right | 40 km || 
|-id=238 bgcolor=#E9E9E9
| 1238 Predappia || 1932 CA ||  || February 4, 1932 || Pino Torinese || L. Volta || ADE || align=right | 21 km || 
|-id=239 bgcolor=#E9E9E9
| 1239 Queteleta || 1932 CB ||  || February 4, 1932 || Uccle || E. Delporte || — || align=right | 19 km || 
|-id=240 bgcolor=#d6d6d6
| 1240 Centenaria || 1932 CD ||  || February 5, 1932 || Hamburg-Bergedorf || R. Schorr || — || align=right | 63 km || 
|-id=241 bgcolor=#d6d6d6
| 1241 Dysona ||  ||  || March 4, 1932 || Johannesburg || H. E. Wood || — || align=right | 79 km || 
|-id=242 bgcolor=#E9E9E9
| 1242 Zambesia || 1932 HL ||  || April 28, 1932 || Johannesburg || C. Jackson || — || align=right | 48 km || 
|-id=243 bgcolor=#d6d6d6
| 1243 Pamela || 1932 JE ||  || May 7, 1932 || Johannesburg || C. Jackson || — || align=right | 70 km || 
|-id=244 bgcolor=#fefefe
| 1244 Deira || 1932 KE ||  || May 25, 1932 || Johannesburg || C. Jackson || slow || align=right | 32 km || 
|-id=245 bgcolor=#d6d6d6
| 1245 Calvinia || 1932 KF ||  || May 26, 1932 || Johannesburg || C. Jackson || — || align=right | 30 km || 
|-id=246 bgcolor=#E9E9E9
| 1246 Chaka || 1932 OA ||  || July 23, 1932 || Johannesburg || C. Jackson || — || align=right | 18 km || 
|-id=247 bgcolor=#d6d6d6
| 1247 Memoria || 1932 QA ||  || August 30, 1932 || Uccle || M. Laugier || THM || align=right | 39 km || 
|-id=248 bgcolor=#E9E9E9
| 1248 Jugurtha || 1932 RO ||  || September 1, 1932 || Johannesburg || C. Jackson || — || align=right | 28 km || 
|-id=249 bgcolor=#fefefe
| 1249 Rutherfordia || 1932 VB ||  || November 4, 1932 || Heidelberg || K. Reinmuth || FLO || align=right | 13 km || 
|-id=250 bgcolor=#E9E9E9
| 1250 Galanthus || 1933 BD ||  || January 25, 1933 || Heidelberg || K. Reinmuth || — || align=right | 20 km || 
|-id=251 bgcolor=#E9E9E9
| 1251 Hedera || 1933 BE ||  || January 25, 1933 || Heidelberg || K. Reinmuth || — || align=right | 13 km || 
|-id=252 bgcolor=#E9E9E9
| 1252 Celestia || 1933 DG ||  || February 19, 1933 || Oak Ridge Observatory || F. L. Whipple || PAL || align=right | 19 km || 
|-id=253 bgcolor=#d6d6d6
| 1253 Frisia ||  ||  || October 9, 1931 || Heidelberg || K. Reinmuth || THM || align=right | 22 km || 
|-id=254 bgcolor=#d6d6d6
| 1254 Erfordia || 1932 JA ||  || May 10, 1932 || La Plata Observatory || J. Hartmann || — || align=right | 52 km || 
|-id=255 bgcolor=#d6d6d6
| 1255 Schilowa || 1932 NC ||  || July 8, 1932 || Crimea-Simeis || G. N. Neujmin || — || align=right | 34 km || 
|-id=256 bgcolor=#d6d6d6
| 1256 Normannia || 1932 PD ||  || August 8, 1932 || Heidelberg || K. Reinmuth || 3:2slow || align=right | 68 km || 
|-id=257 bgcolor=#fefefe
| 1257 Móra || 1932 PE ||  || August 8, 1932 || Heidelberg || K. Reinmuth || — || align=right | 21 km || 
|-id=258 bgcolor=#d6d6d6
| 1258 Sicilia || 1932 PG ||  || August 8, 1932 || Heidelberg || K. Reinmuth || — || align=right | 46 km || 
|-id=259 bgcolor=#d6d6d6
| 1259 Ógyalla || 1933 BT ||  || January 29, 1933 || Heidelberg || K. Reinmuth || THM || align=right | 36 km || 
|-id=260 bgcolor=#E9E9E9
| 1260 Walhalla || 1933 BW ||  || January 29, 1933 || Heidelberg || K. Reinmuth || — || align=right | 13 km || 
|-id=261 bgcolor=#d6d6d6
| 1261 Legia || 1933 FB ||  || March 23, 1933 || Uccle || E. Delporte || — || align=right | 33 km || 
|-id=262 bgcolor=#d6d6d6
| 1262 Sniadeckia || 1933 FE ||  || March 23, 1933 || Uccle || S. Arend || — || align=right | 71 km || 
|-id=263 bgcolor=#E9E9E9
| 1263 Varsavia || 1933 FF ||  || March 23, 1933 || Uccle || S. Arend || BRU || align=right | 49 km || 
|-id=264 bgcolor=#d6d6d6
| 1264 Letaba || 1933 HG ||  || April 21, 1933 || Johannesburg || C. Jackson || — || align=right | 66 km || 
|-id=265 bgcolor=#d6d6d6
| 1265 Schweikarda || 1911 MV ||  || October 18, 1911 || Heidelberg || F. Kaiser || — || align=right | 19 km || 
|-id=266 bgcolor=#d6d6d6
| 1266 Tone || 1927 BD ||  || January 23, 1927 || Tokyo || O. Oikawa || 7:4 || align=right | 75 km || 
|-id=267 bgcolor=#fefefe
| 1267 Geertruida || 1930 HD ||  || April 23, 1930 || Johannesburg || H. van Gent || — || align=right | 23 km || 
|-id=268 bgcolor=#d6d6d6
| 1268 Libya || 1930 HJ ||  || April 29, 1930 || Johannesburg || C. Jackson || 3:2 || align=right | 97 km || 
|-id=269 bgcolor=#d6d6d6
| 1269 Rollandia || 1930 SH ||  || September 20, 1930 || Crimea-Simeis || G. N. Neujmin || 3:2 || align=right | 105 km || 
|-id=270 bgcolor=#fefefe
| 1270 Datura || 1930 YE ||  || December 17, 1930 || Williams Bay || G. Van Biesbroeck || DAT || align=right | 8.2 km || 
|-id=271 bgcolor=#d6d6d6
| 1271 Isergina || 1931 TN ||  || October 10, 1931 || Crimea-Simeis || G. N. Neujmin || — || align=right | 48 km || 
|-id=272 bgcolor=#E9E9E9
| 1272 Gefion ||  ||  || October 10, 1931 || Heidelberg || K. Reinmuth || GEF || align=right | 7.0 km || 
|-id=273 bgcolor=#fefefe
| 1273 Helma || 1932 PF ||  || August 8, 1932 || Heidelberg || K. Reinmuth || V || align=right | 6.3 km || 
|-id=274 bgcolor=#fefefe
| 1274 Delportia || 1932 WC ||  || November 28, 1932 || Uccle || E. Delporte || — || align=right | 9.6 km || 
|-id=275 bgcolor=#E9E9E9
| 1275 Cimbria || 1932 WG ||  || November 30, 1932 || Heidelberg || K. Reinmuth || EUN || align=right | 28 km || 
|-id=276 bgcolor=#d6d6d6
| 1276 Ucclia || 1933 BA ||  || January 24, 1933 || Uccle || E. Delporte || ALA || align=right | 36 km || 
|-id=277 bgcolor=#E9E9E9
| 1277 Dolores || 1933 HA ||  || April 18, 1933 || Crimea-Simeis || G. N. Neujmin || — || align=right | 33 km || 
|-id=278 bgcolor=#fefefe
| 1278 Kenya || 1933 LA ||  || June 15, 1933 || Johannesburg || C. Jackson || slow || align=right | 19 km || 
|-id=279 bgcolor=#fefefe
| 1279 Uganda || 1933 LB ||  || June 15, 1933 || Johannesburg || C. Jackson || — || align=right | 6.8 km || 
|-id=280 bgcolor=#d6d6d6
| 1280 Baillauda || 1933 QB ||  || August 18, 1933 || Uccle || E. Delporte || 7:4 || align=right | 51 km || 
|-id=281 bgcolor=#E9E9E9
| 1281 Jeanne || 1933 QJ ||  || August 25, 1933 || Uccle || S. Arend || — || align=right | 26 km || 
|-id=282 bgcolor=#d6d6d6
| 1282 Utopia ||  ||  || August 17, 1933 || Johannesburg || C. Jackson || — || align=right | 58 km || 
|-id=283 bgcolor=#d6d6d6
| 1283 Komsomolia || 1925 SC ||  || September 25, 1925 || Crimea-Simeis || V. Albitskij || — || align=right | 30 km || 
|-id=284 bgcolor=#E9E9E9
| 1284 Latvia || 1933 OP ||  || July 27, 1933 || Heidelberg || K. Reinmuth || — || align=right | 41 km || 
|-id=285 bgcolor=#d6d6d6
| 1285 Julietta || 1933 QF ||  || August 21, 1933 || Uccle || E. Delporte || — || align=right | 42 km || 
|-id=286 bgcolor=#d6d6d6
| 1286 Banachiewicza || 1933 QH ||  || August 25, 1933 || Uccle || S. Arend || EOS || align=right | 21 km || 
|-id=287 bgcolor=#d6d6d6
| 1287 Lorcia || 1933 QL ||  || August 25, 1933 || Uccle || S. Arend || EOS || align=right | 22 km || 
|-id=288 bgcolor=#d6d6d6
| 1288 Santa || 1933 QM ||  || August 26, 1933 || Uccle || E. Delporte || — || align=right | 31 km || 
|-id=289 bgcolor=#d6d6d6
| 1289 Kutaïssi || 1933 QR ||  || August 19, 1933 || Crimea-Simeis || G. N. Neujmin || KOR || align=right | 22 km || 
|-id=290 bgcolor=#fefefe
| 1290 Albertine ||  ||  || August 21, 1933 || Uccle || E. Delporte || — || align=right | 7.9 km || 
|-id=291 bgcolor=#d6d6d6
| 1291 Phryne || 1933 RA ||  || September 15, 1933 || Uccle || E. Delporte || EOS || align=right | 27 km || 
|-id=292 bgcolor=#E9E9E9
| 1292 Luce || 1933 SH ||  || September 17, 1933 || Uccle || F. Rigaux || — || align=right | 14 km || 
|-id=293 bgcolor=#FA8072
| 1293 Sonja || 1933 SO ||  || September 26, 1933 || Uccle || E. Delporte || — || align=right | 7.8 km || 
|-id=294 bgcolor=#E9E9E9
| 1294 Antwerpia ||  ||  || October 24, 1933 || Uccle || E. Delporte || — || align=right | 37 km || 
|-id=295 bgcolor=#d6d6d6
| 1295 Deflotte || 1933 WD ||  || November 25, 1933 || Algiers || L. Boyer || 7:4 || align=right | 47 km || 
|-id=296 bgcolor=#fefefe
| 1296 Andrée || 1933 WE ||  || November 25, 1933 || Algiers || L. Boyer || — || align=right | 26 km || 
|-id=297 bgcolor=#d6d6d6
| 1297 Quadea || 1934 AD ||  || January 7, 1934 || Heidelberg || K. Reinmuth || EOS || align=right | 22 km || 
|-id=298 bgcolor=#d6d6d6
| 1298 Nocturna || 1934 AE ||  || January 7, 1934 || Heidelberg || K. Reinmuth || — || align=right | 38 km || 
|-id=299 bgcolor=#E9E9E9
| 1299 Mertona || 1934 BA ||  || January 18, 1934 || Algiers || G. Reiss || — || align=right | 14 km || 
|-id=300 bgcolor=#E9E9E9
| 1300 Marcelle || 1934 CL ||  || February 10, 1934 || Algiers || G. Reiss || — || align=right | 28 km || 
|}

1301–1400 

|-bgcolor=#E9E9E9
| 1301 Yvonne || 1934 EA ||  || March 7, 1934 || Algiers || L. Boyer || — || align=right | 21 km || 
|-id=302 bgcolor=#d6d6d6
| 1302 Werra || 1924 SV ||  || September 28, 1924 || Heidelberg || K. Reinmuth || THM || align=right | 35 km || 
|-id=303 bgcolor=#d6d6d6
| 1303 Luthera || 1928 FP ||  || March 16, 1928 || Hamburg-Bergedorf || A. Schwassmann || LUT || align=right | 82 km || 
|-id=304 bgcolor=#d6d6d6
| 1304 Arosa || 1928 KC ||  || May 21, 1928 || Heidelberg || K. Reinmuth || — || align=right | 44 km || 
|-id=305 bgcolor=#d6d6d6
| 1305 Pongola || 1928 OC ||  || July 19, 1928 || Johannesburg || H. E. Wood || — || align=right | 24 km || 
|-id=306 bgcolor=#d6d6d6
| 1306 Scythia || 1930 OB ||  || July 22, 1930 || Crimea-Simeis || G. N. Neujmin || URS || align=right | 67 km || 
|-id=307 bgcolor=#fefefe
| 1307 Cimmeria || 1930 UF ||  || October 17, 1930 || Crimea-Simeis || G. N. Neujmin || FLO || align=right | 9.4 km || 
|-id=308 bgcolor=#d6d6d6
| 1308 Halleria || 1931 EB ||  || March 12, 1931 || Heidelberg || K. Reinmuth || CHA || align=right | 47 km || 
|-id=309 bgcolor=#d6d6d6
| 1309 Hyperborea || 1931 TO ||  || October 11, 1931 || Crimea-Simeis || G. N. Neujmin || — || align=right | 58 km || 
|-id=310 bgcolor=#FA8072
| 1310 Villigera || 1932 DB ||  || February 28, 1932 || Hamburg-Bergedorf || A. Schwassmann || — || align=right | 14 km || 
|-id=311 bgcolor=#fefefe
| 1311 Knopfia ||  ||  || March 24, 1933 || Heidelberg || K. Reinmuth || — || align=right | 9.9 km || 
|-id=312 bgcolor=#d6d6d6
| 1312 Vassar || 1933 OT ||  || July 27, 1933 || Williams Bay || G. Van Biesbroeck || ALA || align=right | 36 km || 
|-id=313 bgcolor=#E9E9E9
| 1313 Berna || 1933 QG ||  || August 24, 1933 || Uccle || S. Arend || moon || align=right | 14 km || 
|-id=314 bgcolor=#fefefe
| 1314 Paula || 1933 SC ||  || September 16, 1933 || Uccle || S. Arend || FLO || align=right | 8.2 km || 
|-id=315 bgcolor=#d6d6d6
| 1315 Bronislawa ||  ||  || September 16, 1933 || Uccle || S. Arend || — || align=right | 65 km || 
|-id=316 bgcolor=#FA8072
| 1316 Kasan || 1933 WC ||  || November 17, 1933 || Crimea-Simeis || G. N. Neujmin || — || align=right | 6.8 km || 
|-id=317 bgcolor=#d6d6d6
| 1317 Silvretta || 1935 RC ||  || September 1, 1935 || Heidelberg || K. Reinmuth || — || align=right | 18 km || 
|-id=318 bgcolor=#fefefe
| 1318 Nerina || 1934 FG ||  || March 24, 1934 || Johannesburg || C. Jackson || PHO || align=right | 13 km || 
|-id=319 bgcolor=#d6d6d6
| 1319 Disa || 1934 FO ||  || March 19, 1934 || Johannesburg || C. Jackson || — || align=right | 26 km || 
|-id=320 bgcolor=#d6d6d6
| 1320 Impala || 1934 JG ||  || May 13, 1934 || Johannesburg || C. Jackson || — || align=right | 37 km || 
|-id=321 bgcolor=#d6d6d6
| 1321 Majuba || 1934 JH ||  || May 7, 1934 || Johannesburg || C. Jackson || — || align=right | 37 km || 
|-id=322 bgcolor=#fefefe
| 1322 Coppernicus || 1934 LA ||  || June 15, 1934 || Heidelberg || K. Reinmuth || — || align=right | 10 km || 
|-id=323 bgcolor=#d6d6d6
| 1323 Tugela || 1934 LD ||  || May 19, 1934 || Johannesburg || C. Jackson || — || align=right | 78 km || 
|-id=324 bgcolor=#fefefe
| 1324 Knysna || 1934 LL ||  || June 15, 1934 || Johannesburg || C. Jackson || FLO || align=right | 6.5 km || 
|-id=325 bgcolor=#E9E9E9
| 1325 Inanda || 1934 NR ||  || July 14, 1934 || Johannesburg || C. Jackson || — || align=right | 11 km || 
|-id=326 bgcolor=#E9E9E9
| 1326 Losaka || 1934 NS ||  || July 14, 1934 || Johannesburg || C. Jackson || — || align=right | 26 km || 
|-id=327 bgcolor=#E9E9E9
| 1327 Namaqua || 1934 RT ||  || September 7, 1934 || Johannesburg || C. Jackson || MRX || align=right | 22 km || 
|-id=328 bgcolor=#d6d6d6
| 1328 Devota || 1925 UA ||  || October 21, 1925 || Algiers || B. Jekhovsky || 7:4 || align=right | 54 km || 
|-id=329 bgcolor=#E9E9E9
| 1329 Eliane || 1933 FL ||  || March 23, 1933 || Uccle || E. Delporte || EUNslow || align=right | 19 km || 
|-id=330 bgcolor=#d6d6d6
| 1330 Spiridonia || 1925 DB ||  || February 17, 1925 || Crimea-Simeis || V. Albitskij || — || align=right | 68 km || 
|-id=331 bgcolor=#d6d6d6
| 1331 Solvejg || 1933 QS ||  || August 25, 1933 || Crimea-Simeis || G. N. Neujmin || — || align=right | 37 km || 
|-id=332 bgcolor=#d6d6d6
| 1332 Marconia || 1934 AA ||  || January 9, 1934 || Pino Torinese || L. Volta || MRC || align=right | 47 km || 
|-id=333 bgcolor=#E9E9E9
| 1333 Cevenola || 1934 DA ||  || February 20, 1934 || Algiers || O. Bancilhon || EUNmoon || align=right | 15 km || 
|-id=334 bgcolor=#d6d6d6
| 1334 Lundmarka || 1934 OB ||  || July 16, 1934 || Heidelberg || K. Reinmuth || — || align=right | 28 km || 
|-id=335 bgcolor=#fefefe
| 1335 Demoulina || 1934 RE ||  || September 7, 1934 || Heidelberg || K. Reinmuth || — || align=right | 7.5 km || 
|-id=336 bgcolor=#d6d6d6
| 1336 Zeelandia || 1934 RW ||  || September 9, 1934 || Johannesburg || H. van Gent || KOR || align=right | 21 km || 
|-id=337 bgcolor=#d6d6d6
| 1337 Gerarda ||  ||  || September 9, 1934 || Johannesburg || H. van Gent || — || align=right | 41 km || 
|-id=338 bgcolor=#fefefe
| 1338 Duponta || 1934 XA ||  || December 4, 1934 || Algiers || L. Boyer || FLOmoon || align=right | 7.5 km || 
|-id=339 bgcolor=#d6d6d6
| 1339 Désagneauxa || 1934 XB ||  || December 4, 1934 || Algiers || L. Boyer || EOS || align=right | 24 km || 
|-id=340 bgcolor=#d6d6d6
| 1340 Yvette || 1934 YA ||  || December 27, 1934 || Algiers || L. Boyer || THM || align=right | 29 km || 
|-id=341 bgcolor=#E9E9E9
| 1341 Edmée || 1935 BA ||  || January 27, 1935 || Uccle || E. Delporte || — || align=right | 24 km || 
|-id=342 bgcolor=#fefefe
| 1342 Brabantia || 1935 CV ||  || February 13, 1935 || Johannesburg || H. van Gent || — || align=right | 12 km || 
|-id=343 bgcolor=#E9E9E9
| 1343 Nicole || 1935 FC ||  || March 29, 1935 || Algiers || L. Boyer || — || align=right | 24 km || 
|-id=344 bgcolor=#fefefe
| 1344 Caubeta || 1935 GA ||  || April 1, 1935 || Algiers || L. Boyer || moon || align=right | 5.8 km || 
|-id=345 bgcolor=#d6d6d6
| 1345 Potomac || 1908 CG ||  || February 4, 1908 || Taunton || J. H. Metcalf || 3:2 || align=right | 73 km || 
|-id=346 bgcolor=#E9E9E9
| 1346 Gotha || 1929 CY ||  || February 5, 1929 || Heidelberg || K. Reinmuth || — || align=right | 14 km || 
|-id=347 bgcolor=#E9E9E9
| 1347 Patria || 1931 VW ||  || November 6, 1931 || Crimea-Simeis || G. N. Neujmin || — || align=right | 32 km || 
|-id=348 bgcolor=#E9E9E9
| 1348 Michel || 1933 FD ||  || March 23, 1933 || Uccle || S. Arend || — || align=right | 16 km || 
|-id=349 bgcolor=#d6d6d6
| 1349 Bechuana || 1934 LJ ||  || June 13, 1934 || Johannesburg || C. Jackson || — || align=right | 24 km || 
|-id=350 bgcolor=#d6d6d6
| 1350 Rosselia || 1934 TA ||  || October 3, 1934 || Uccle || E. Delporte || KOR || align=right | 21 km || 
|-id=351 bgcolor=#d6d6d6
| 1351 Uzbekistania || 1934 TF ||  || October 5, 1934 || Crimea-Simeis || G. N. Neujmin || — || align=right | 60 km || 
|-id=352 bgcolor=#E9E9E9
| 1352 Wawel || 1935 CE ||  || February 3, 1935 || Uccle || S. Arend || — || align=right | 20 km || 
|-id=353 bgcolor=#d6d6d6
| 1353 Maartje || 1935 CU ||  || February 13, 1935 || Johannesburg || H. van Gent || EOS || align=right | 39 km || 
|-id=354 bgcolor=#d6d6d6
| 1354 Botha || 1935 GK ||  || April 3, 1935 || Johannesburg || C. Jackson || — || align=right | 42 km || 
|-id=355 bgcolor=#fefefe
| 1355 Magoeba || 1935 HE ||  || April 30, 1935 || Johannesburg || C. Jackson || H || align=right | 4.3 km || 
|-id=356 bgcolor=#d6d6d6
| 1356 Nyanza || 1935 JH ||  || May 3, 1935 || Johannesburg || C. Jackson || — || align=right | 61 km || 
|-id=357 bgcolor=#d6d6d6
| 1357 Khama || 1935 ND ||  || July 2, 1935 || Johannesburg || C. Jackson || — || align=right | 38 km || 
|-id=358 bgcolor=#fefefe
| 1358 Gaika || 1935 OB ||  || July 21, 1935 || Johannesburg || C. Jackson || NYS || align=right | 22 km || 
|-id=359 bgcolor=#d6d6d6
| 1359 Prieska || 1935 OC ||  || July 22, 1935 || Johannesburg || C. Jackson || — || align=right | 46 km || 
|-id=360 bgcolor=#E9E9E9
| 1360 Tarka || 1935 OD ||  || July 22, 1935 || Johannesburg || C. Jackson || — || align=right | 33 km || 
|-id=361 bgcolor=#d6d6d6
| 1361 Leuschneria || 1935 QA ||  || August 30, 1935 || Uccle || E. Delporte || — || align=right | 30 km || 
|-id=362 bgcolor=#d6d6d6
| 1362 Griqua ||  ||  || July 31, 1935 || Johannesburg || C. Jackson || 2:1J || align=right | 27 km || 
|-id=363 bgcolor=#d6d6d6
| 1363 Herberta || 1935 RA ||  || August 30, 1935 || Uccle || E. Delporte || KOR || align=right | 14 km || 
|-id=364 bgcolor=#d6d6d6
| 1364 Safara || 1935 VB ||  || November 18, 1935 || Algiers || L. Boyer || EOS || align=right | 21 km || 
|-id=365 bgcolor=#fefefe
| 1365 Henyey || 1928 RK ||  || September 9, 1928 || Heidelberg || M. F. Wolf || FLO || align=right | 11 km || 
|-id=366 bgcolor=#d6d6d6
| 1366 Piccolo || 1932 WA ||  || November 29, 1932 || Uccle || E. Delporte || — || align=right | 28 km || 
|-id=367 bgcolor=#fefefe
| 1367 Nongoma || 1934 NA ||  || July 3, 1934 || Johannesburg || C. Jackson || PHO || align=right | 9.4 km || 
|-id=368 bgcolor=#E9E9E9
| 1368 Numidia || 1935 HD ||  || April 30, 1935 || Johannesburg || C. Jackson || — || align=right | 20 km || 
|-id=369 bgcolor=#d6d6d6
| 1369 Ostanina || 1935 QB ||  || August 27, 1935 || Crimea-Simeis || P. F. Shajn || MEL || align=right | 42 km || 
|-id=370 bgcolor=#fefefe
| 1370 Hella || 1935 QG ||  || August 31, 1935 || Heidelberg || K. Reinmuth || FLO || align=right | 4.4 km || 
|-id=371 bgcolor=#d6d6d6
| 1371 Resi || 1935 QJ ||  || August 31, 1935 || Heidelberg || K. Reinmuth || URS || align=right | 27 km || 
|-id=372 bgcolor=#E9E9E9
| 1372 Haremari || 1935 QK ||  || August 31, 1935 || Heidelberg || K. Reinmuth || WAT || align=right | 26 km || 
|-id=373 bgcolor=#d6d6d6
| 1373 Cincinnati || 1935 QN ||  || August 30, 1935 || Mount Wilson || E. Hubble || 7:4* || align=right | 19 km || 
|-id=374 bgcolor=#FA8072
| 1374 Isora || 1935 UA ||  || October 21, 1935 || Uccle || E. Delporte || — || align=right | 6.5 km || 
|-id=375 bgcolor=#fefefe
| 1375 Alfreda || 1935 UB ||  || October 22, 1935 || Uccle || E. Delporte || — || align=right | 14 km || 
|-id=376 bgcolor=#fefefe
| 1376 Michelle || 1935 UH ||  || October 29, 1935 || Algiers || G. Reiss || — || align=right | 7.1 km || 
|-id=377 bgcolor=#fefefe
| 1377 Roberbauxa || 1936 CD ||  || February 14, 1936 || Algiers || L. Boyer || — || align=right | 6.2 km || 
|-id=378 bgcolor=#fefefe
| 1378 Leonce || 1936 DB ||  || February 21, 1936 || Uccle || F. Rigaux || NYS || align=right | 21 km || 
|-id=379 bgcolor=#E9E9E9
| 1379 Lomonosowa || 1936 FC ||  || March 19, 1936 || Crimea-Simeis || G. N. Neujmin || — || align=right | 19 km || 
|-id=380 bgcolor=#d6d6d6
| 1380 Volodia || 1936 FM ||  || March 16, 1936 || Algiers || L. Boyer || — || align=right | 21 km || 
|-id=381 bgcolor=#fefefe
| 1381 Danubia || 1930 QJ ||  || August 20, 1930 || Crimea-Simeis || E. Skvorcov || — || align=right | 20 km || 
|-id=382 bgcolor=#fefefe
| 1382 Gerti || 1925 BB ||  || January 21, 1925 || Heidelberg || K. Reinmuth || — || align=right | 12 km || 
|-id=383 bgcolor=#d6d6d6
| 1383 Limburgia || 1934 RV ||  || September 9, 1934 || Johannesburg || H. van Gent || THM || align=right | 23 km || 
|-id=384 bgcolor=#E9E9E9
| 1384 Kniertje || 1934 RX ||  || September 9, 1934 || Johannesburg || H. van Gent || ADE || align=right | 27 km || 
|-id=385 bgcolor=#E9E9E9
| 1385 Gelria || 1935 MJ ||  || May 24, 1935 || Johannesburg || H. van Gent || — || align=right | 20 km || 
|-id=386 bgcolor=#fefefe
| 1386 Storeria || 1935 PA ||  || July 28, 1935 || Crimea-Simeis || G. N. Neujmin || CHL || align=right | 11 km || 
|-id=387 bgcolor=#fefefe
| 1387 Kama || 1935 QD ||  || August 27, 1935 || Crimea-Simeis || P. F. Shajn || FLO || align=right | 7.5 km || 
|-id=388 bgcolor=#d6d6d6
| 1388 Aphrodite || 1935 SS ||  || September 24, 1935 || Uccle || E. Delporte || EOS || align=right | 21 km || 
|-id=389 bgcolor=#d6d6d6
| 1389 Onnie ||  ||  || September 28, 1935 || Johannesburg || H. van Gent || KOR || align=right | 14 km || 
|-id=390 bgcolor=#d6d6d6
| 1390 Abastumani || 1935 TA ||  || October 3, 1935 || Crimea-Simeis || P. F. Shajn || 7:4 || align=right | 96 km || 
|-id=391 bgcolor=#E9E9E9
| 1391 Carelia || 1936 DA ||  || February 16, 1936 || Turku || Y. Väisälä || — || align=right | 11 km || 
|-id=392 bgcolor=#E9E9E9
| 1392 Pierre || 1936 FO ||  || March 16, 1936 || Algiers || L. Boyer || — || align=right | 26 km || 
|-id=393 bgcolor=#fefefe
| 1393 Sofala || 1936 KD ||  || May 25, 1936 || Johannesburg || C. Jackson || — || align=right | 11 km || 
|-id=394 bgcolor=#fefefe
| 1394 Algoa || 1936 LK ||  || June 12, 1936 || Johannesburg || C. Jackson || — || align=right | 14 km || 
|-id=395 bgcolor=#d6d6d6
| 1395 Aribeda || 1936 OB ||  || July 16, 1936 || Heidelberg || K. Reinmuth || — || align=right | 20 km || 
|-id=396 bgcolor=#fefefe
| 1396 Outeniqua || 1936 PF ||  || August 9, 1936 || Johannesburg || C. Jackson || FLO || align=right | 12 km || 
|-id=397 bgcolor=#E9E9E9
| 1397 Umtata || 1936 PG ||  || August 9, 1936 || Johannesburg || C. Jackson || — || align=right | 21 km || 
|-id=398 bgcolor=#d6d6d6
| 1398 Donnera || 1936 QL ||  || August 26, 1936 || Turku || Y. Väisälä || — || align=right | 25 km || 
|-id=399 bgcolor=#fefefe
| 1399 Teneriffa || 1936 QY ||  || August 23, 1936 || Heidelberg || K. Reinmuth || FLO || align=right | 4.9 km || 
|-id=400 bgcolor=#d6d6d6
| 1400 Tirela || 1936 WA ||  || November 17, 1936 || Algiers || L. Boyer || TIR || align=right | 16 km || 
|}

1401–1500 

|-bgcolor=#fefefe
| 1401 Lavonne || 1935 UD ||  || October 22, 1935 || Uccle || E. Delporte || — || align=right | 9.3 km || 
|-id=402 bgcolor=#E9E9E9
| 1402 Eri || 1936 OC ||  || July 16, 1936 || Heidelberg || K. Reinmuth || — || align=right | 14 km || 
|-id=403 bgcolor=#E9E9E9
| 1403 Idelsonia || 1936 QA ||  || August 13, 1936 || Crimea-Simeis || G. N. Neujmin || CLO || align=right | 27 km || 
|-id=404 bgcolor=#C2FFFF
| 1404 Ajax || 1936 QW ||  || August 17, 1936 || Heidelberg || K. Reinmuth || L4 || align=right | 84 km || 
|-id=405 bgcolor=#fefefe
| 1405 Sibelius || 1936 RE ||  || September 12, 1936 || Turku || Y. Väisälä || — || align=right | 6.8 km || 
|-id=406 bgcolor=#E9E9E9
| 1406 Komppa || 1936 RF ||  || September 13, 1936 || Turku || Y. Väisälä || — || align=right | 24 km || 
|-id=407 bgcolor=#E9E9E9
| 1407 Lindelöf || 1936 WC ||  || November 21, 1936 || Turku || Y. Väisälä || — || align=right | 20 km || 
|-id=408 bgcolor=#d6d6d6
| 1408 Trusanda || 1936 WF ||  || November 23, 1936 || Heidelberg || K. Reinmuth || — || align=right | 35 km || 
|-id=409 bgcolor=#E9E9E9
| 1409 Isko || 1937 AK ||  || January 8, 1937 || Heidelberg || K. Reinmuth || — || align=right | 36 km || 
|-id=410 bgcolor=#d6d6d6
| 1410 Margret || 1937 AL ||  || January 8, 1937 || Heidelberg || K. Reinmuth || EOS || align=right | 21 km || 
|-id=411 bgcolor=#d6d6d6
| 1411 Brauna || 1937 AM ||  || January 8, 1937 || Heidelberg || K. Reinmuth || — || align=right | 28 km || 
|-id=412 bgcolor=#fefefe
| 1412 Lagrula || 1937 BA ||  || January 19, 1937 || Algiers || L. Boyer || FLO || align=right | 7.8 km || 
|-id=413 bgcolor=#d6d6d6
| 1413 Roucarie || 1937 CD ||  || February 12, 1937 || Algiers || L. Boyer || EOS || align=right | 20 km || 
|-id=414 bgcolor=#E9E9E9
| 1414 Jérôme || 1937 CE ||  || February 12, 1937 || Algiers || L. Boyer || DOR || align=right | 15 km || 
|-id=415 bgcolor=#fefefe
| 1415 Malautra || 1937 EA ||  || March 4, 1937 || Algiers || L. Boyer || — || align=right | 7.4 km || 
|-id=416 bgcolor=#d6d6d6
| 1416 Renauxa || 1937 EC ||  || March 4, 1937 || Algiers || L. Boyer || EOS || align=right | 28 km || 
|-id=417 bgcolor=#d6d6d6
| 1417 Walinskia || 1937 GH ||  || April 1, 1937 || Heidelberg || K. Reinmuth || — || align=right | 17 km || 
|-id=418 bgcolor=#fefefe
| 1418 Fayeta || 1903 RG ||  || September 22, 1903 || Heidelberg || P. Götz || FLO || align=right | 12 km || 
|-id=419 bgcolor=#fefefe
| 1419 Danzig || 1929 RF ||  || September 5, 1929 || Heidelberg || K. Reinmuth || FLO || align=right | 15 km || 
|-id=420 bgcolor=#E9E9E9
| 1420 Radcliffe || 1931 RJ ||  || September 14, 1931 || Heidelberg || K. Reinmuth || — || align=right | 21 km || 
|-id=421 bgcolor=#d6d6d6
| 1421 Esperanto || 1936 FQ ||  || March 18, 1936 || Turku || Y. Väisälä || — || align=right | 43 km || 
|-id=422 bgcolor=#fefefe
| 1422 Strömgrenia || 1936 QF ||  || August 23, 1936 || Heidelberg || K. Reinmuth || FLO || align=right | 5.8 km || 
|-id=423 bgcolor=#d6d6d6
| 1423 Jose || 1936 QM ||  || August 28, 1936 || Uccle || J. Hunaerts || KOR || align=right | 20 km || 
|-id=424 bgcolor=#d6d6d6
| 1424 Sundmania || 1937 AJ ||  || January 9, 1937 || Turku || Y. Väisälä || — || align=right | 65 km || 
|-id=425 bgcolor=#E9E9E9
| 1425 Tuorla || 1937 GB ||  || April 3, 1937 || Turku || K. Inkeri || EUN || align=right | 12 km || 
|-id=426 bgcolor=#E9E9E9
| 1426 Riviera || 1937 GF ||  || April 1, 1937 || Nice || M. Laugier || — || align=right | 18 km || 
|-id=427 bgcolor=#E9E9E9
| 1427 Ruvuma || 1937 KB ||  || May 16, 1937 || Johannesburg || C. Jackson || — || align=right | 35 km || 
|-id=428 bgcolor=#E9E9E9
| 1428 Mombasa || 1937 NO ||  || July 5, 1937 || Johannesburg || C. Jackson || — || align=right | 52 km || 
|-id=429 bgcolor=#E9E9E9
| 1429 Pemba || 1937 NH ||  || July 2, 1937 || Johannesburg || C. Jackson || — || align=right | 9.9 km || 
|-id=430 bgcolor=#E9E9E9
| 1430 Somalia || 1937 NK ||  || July 5, 1937 || Johannesburg || C. Jackson || — || align=right | 9.4 km || 
|-id=431 bgcolor=#E9E9E9
| 1431 Luanda || 1937 OB ||  || July 29, 1937 || Johannesburg || C. Jackson || EUN || align=right | 14 km || 
|-id=432 bgcolor=#fefefe
| 1432 Ethiopia || 1937 PG ||  || August 1, 1937 || Johannesburg || C. Jackson || — || align=right | 7.1 km || 
|-id=433 bgcolor=#E9E9E9
| 1433 Geramtina || 1937 UC ||  || October 30, 1937 || Uccle || E. Delporte || — || align=right | 13 km || 
|-id=434 bgcolor=#d6d6d6
| 1434 Margot ||  ||  || March 19, 1936 || Crimea-Simeis || G. N. Neujmin || EOS || align=right | 27 km || 
|-id=435 bgcolor=#E9E9E9
| 1435 Garlena || 1936 WE ||  || November 23, 1936 || Heidelberg || K. Reinmuth || — || align=right | 15 km || 
|-id=436 bgcolor=#d6d6d6
| 1436 Salonta || 1936 YA ||  || December 11, 1936 || Konkoly || G. Kulin || — || align=right | 54 km || 
|-id=437 bgcolor=#C2FFFF
| 1437 Diomedes || 1937 PB ||  || August 3, 1937 || Heidelberg || K. Reinmuth || L4 || align=right | 118 km || 
|-id=438 bgcolor=#d6d6d6
| 1438 Wendeline || 1937 TC ||  || October 11, 1937 || Heidelberg || K. Reinmuth || — || align=right | 38 km || 
|-id=439 bgcolor=#d6d6d6
| 1439 Vogtia || 1937 TE ||  || October 11, 1937 || Heidelberg || K. Reinmuth || 3:2 || align=right | 51 km || 
|-id=440 bgcolor=#d6d6d6
| 1440 Rostia || 1937 TF ||  || October 11, 1937 || Heidelberg || K. Reinmuth || — || align=right | 15 km || 
|-id=441 bgcolor=#E9E9E9
| 1441 Bolyai || 1937 WA ||  || November 26, 1937 || Konkoly || G. Kulin || — || align=right | 15 km || 
|-id=442 bgcolor=#d6d6d6
| 1442 Corvina || 1937 YF ||  || December 29, 1937 || Konkoly || G. Kulin || KOR || align=right | 17 km || 
|-id=443 bgcolor=#d6d6d6
| 1443 Ruppina || 1937 YG ||  || December 29, 1937 || Heidelberg || K. Reinmuth || — || align=right | 16 km || 
|-id=444 bgcolor=#d6d6d6
| 1444 Pannonia || 1938 AE ||  || January 6, 1938 || Konkoly || G. Kulin || — || align=right | 26 km || 
|-id=445 bgcolor=#d6d6d6
| 1445 Konkolya || 1938 AF ||  || January 6, 1938 || Konkoly || G. Kulin || THM || align=right | 20 km || 
|-id=446 bgcolor=#fefefe
| 1446 Sillanpää || 1938 BA ||  || January 26, 1938 || Turku || Y. Väisälä || FLO || align=right | 8.2 km || 
|-id=447 bgcolor=#E9E9E9
| 1447 Utra || 1938 BB ||  || January 26, 1938 || Turku || Y. Väisälä || slow || align=right | 12 km || 
|-id=448 bgcolor=#fefefe
| 1448 Lindbladia || 1938 DF ||  || February 16, 1938 || Turku || Y. Väisälä || ERI || align=right | 21 km || 
|-id=449 bgcolor=#fefefe
| 1449 Virtanen || 1938 DO ||  || February 20, 1938 || Turku || Y. Väisälä || FLO || align=right | 9.3 km || 
|-id=450 bgcolor=#E9E9E9
| 1450 Raimonda || 1938 DP ||  || February 20, 1938 || Turku || Y. Väisälä || — || align=right | 18 km || 
|-id=451 bgcolor=#fefefe
| 1451 Granö || 1938 DT ||  || February 22, 1938 || Turku || Y. Väisälä || FLOslow || align=right | 6.2 km || 
|-id=452 bgcolor=#d6d6d6
| 1452 Hunnia ||  ||  || February 26, 1938 || Konkoly || G. Kulin || MEL || align=right | 21 km || 
|-id=453 bgcolor=#fefefe
| 1453 Fennia ||  ||  || March 8, 1938 || Turku || Y. Väisälä || Hmoon || align=right | 6.6 km || 
|-id=454 bgcolor=#fefefe
| 1454 Kalevala || 1936 DO ||  || February 16, 1936 || Turku || Y. Väisälä || — || align=right | 5.1 km || 
|-id=455 bgcolor=#fefefe
| 1455 Mitchella || 1937 LF ||  || June 5, 1937 || Heidelberg || A. Bohrmann || slow || align=right | 6.6 km || 
|-id=456 bgcolor=#d6d6d6
| 1456 Saldanha || 1937 NG ||  || July 2, 1937 || Johannesburg || C. Jackson || — || align=right | 38 km || 
|-id=457 bgcolor=#E9E9E9
| 1457 Ankara || 1937 PA ||  || August 3, 1937 || Heidelberg || K. Reinmuth || — || align=right | 18 km || 
|-id=458 bgcolor=#E9E9E9
| 1458 Mineura || 1937 RC ||  || September 1, 1937 || Uccle || F. Rigaux || EUN || align=right | 17 km || 
|-id=459 bgcolor=#d6d6d6
| 1459 Magnya || 1937 VA ||  || November 4, 1937 || Crimea-Simeis || G. N. Neujmin || — || align=right | 29 km || 
|-id=460 bgcolor=#E9E9E9
| 1460 Haltia || 1937 WC ||  || November 24, 1937 || Turku || Y. Väisälä || — || align=right | 8.4 km || 
|-id=461 bgcolor=#d6d6d6
| 1461 Jean-Jacques || 1937 YL ||  || December 30, 1937 || Nice || M. Laugier || — || align=right | 35 km || 
|-id=462 bgcolor=#d6d6d6
| 1462 Zamenhof || 1938 CA ||  || February 6, 1938 || Turku || Y. Väisälä || THM || align=right | 27 km || 
|-id=463 bgcolor=#d6d6d6
| 1463 Nordenmarkia || 1938 CB ||  || February 6, 1938 || Turku || Y. Väisälä || — || align=right | 37 km || 
|-id=464 bgcolor=#d6d6d6
| 1464 Armisticia || 1939 VO ||  || November 11, 1939 || Williams Bay || G. Van Biesbroeck || EOS || align=right | 23 km || 
|-id=465 bgcolor=#d6d6d6
| 1465 Autonoma || 1938 FA ||  || March 20, 1938 || Hamburg-Bergedorf || A. Wachmann || — || align=right | 18 km || 
|-id=466 bgcolor=#fefefe
| 1466 Mündleria || 1938 KA ||  || May 31, 1938 || Heidelberg || K. Reinmuth || — || align=right | 22 km || 
|-id=467 bgcolor=#d6d6d6
| 1467 Mashona || 1938 OE ||  || July 30, 1938 || Johannesburg || C. Jackson || 7:4 || align=right | 89 km || 
|-id=468 bgcolor=#FA8072
| 1468 Zomba || 1938 PA ||  || July 23, 1938 || Johannesburg || C. Jackson || — || align=right | 8.3 km || 
|-id=469 bgcolor=#d6d6d6
| 1469 Linzia || 1938 QD ||  || August 19, 1938 || Heidelberg || K. Reinmuth || — || align=right | 75 km || 
|-id=470 bgcolor=#d6d6d6
| 1470 Carla || 1938 SD ||  || September 17, 1938 || Heidelberg || A. Bohrmann || — || align=right | 37 km || 
|-id=471 bgcolor=#E9E9E9
| 1471 Tornio ||  ||  || September 16, 1938 || Turku || Y. Väisälä || — || align=right | 29 km || 
|-id=472 bgcolor=#fefefe
| 1472 Muonio || 1938 UQ ||  || October 18, 1938 || Turku || Y. Väisälä || — || align=right | 8.4 km || 
|-id=473 bgcolor=#E9E9E9
| 1473 Ounas || 1938 UT ||  || October 22, 1938 || Turku || Y. Väisälä || slow || align=right | 18 km || 
|-id=474 bgcolor=#FA8072
| 1474 Beira || 1935 QY ||  || August 20, 1935 || Johannesburg || C. Jackson || — || align=right | 17 km || 
|-id=475 bgcolor=#fefefe
| 1475 Yalta || 1935 SM ||  || September 21, 1935 || Crimea-Simeis || P. F. Shajn || — || align=right | 7.9 km || 
|-id=476 bgcolor=#fefefe
| 1476 Cox || 1936 RA ||  || September 10, 1936 || Uccle || E. Delporte || FLO || align=right | 7.4 km || 
|-id=477 bgcolor=#d6d6d6
| 1477 Bonsdorffia || 1938 CC ||  || February 6, 1938 || Turku || Y. Väisälä || — || align=right | 26 km || 
|-id=478 bgcolor=#fefefe
| 1478 Vihuri || 1938 CF ||  || February 6, 1938 || Turku || Y. Väisälä || — || align=right | 9.5 km || 
|-id=479 bgcolor=#E9E9E9
| 1479 Inkeri || 1938 DE ||  || February 16, 1938 || Turku || Y. Väisälä || slow || align=right | 15 km || 
|-id=480 bgcolor=#fefefe
| 1480 Aunus || 1938 DK ||  || February 18, 1938 || Turku || Y. Väisälä || moon || align=right | 6.4 km || 
|-id=481 bgcolor=#d6d6d6
| 1481 Tübingia || 1938 DR ||  || February 7, 1938 || Heidelberg || K. Reinmuth || — || align=right | 34 km || 
|-id=482 bgcolor=#d6d6d6
| 1482 Sebastiana ||  ||  || February 20, 1938 || Heidelberg || K. Reinmuth || KOR || align=right | 17 km || 
|-id=483 bgcolor=#E9E9E9
| 1483 Hakoila ||  ||  || February 24, 1938 || Turku || Y. Väisälä || — || align=right | 11 km || 
|-id=484 bgcolor=#E9E9E9
| 1484 Postrema || 1938 HC ||  || April 29, 1938 || Crimea-Simeis || G. N. Neujmin || POS || align=right | 41 km || 
|-id=485 bgcolor=#d6d6d6
| 1485 Isa || 1938 OB ||  || July 28, 1938 || Heidelberg || K. Reinmuth || EOS || align=right | 17 km || 
|-id=486 bgcolor=#fefefe
| 1486 Marilyn || 1938 QA ||  || August 23, 1938 || Uccle || E. Delporte || — || align=right | 6.4 km || 
|-id=487 bgcolor=#d6d6d6
| 1487 Boda || 1938 WC ||  || November 17, 1938 || Heidelberg || K. Reinmuth || THM || align=right | 26 km || 
|-id=488 bgcolor=#d6d6d6
| 1488 Aura || 1938 XE ||  || December 15, 1938 || Turku || Y. Väisälä || — || align=right | 25 km || 
|-id=489 bgcolor=#d6d6d6
| 1489 Attila || 1939 GC ||  || April 12, 1939 || Konkoly || G. Kulin || — || align=right | 27 km || 
|-id=490 bgcolor=#fefefe
| 1490 Limpopo || 1936 LB ||  || June 14, 1936 || Johannesburg || C. Jackson || — || align=right | 15 km || 
|-id=491 bgcolor=#d6d6d6
| 1491 Balduinus || 1938 EJ ||  || February 23, 1938 || Uccle || E. Delporte || — || align=right | 22 km || 
|-id=492 bgcolor=#fefefe
| 1492 Oppolzer || 1938 FL ||  || March 23, 1938 || Turku || Y. Väisälä || — || align=right | 12 km || 
|-id=493 bgcolor=#fefefe
| 1493 Sigrid || 1938 QB ||  || August 26, 1938 || Uccle || E. Delporte || NYS || align=right | 29 km || 
|-id=494 bgcolor=#fefefe
| 1494 Savo || 1938 SJ ||  || September 16, 1938 || Turku || Y. Väisälä || — || align=right | 7.8 km || 
|-id=495 bgcolor=#E9E9E9
| 1495 Helsinki || 1938 SW ||  || September 21, 1938 || Turku || Y. Väisälä || EUN || align=right | 12 km || 
|-id=496 bgcolor=#fefefe
| 1496 Turku ||  ||  || September 22, 1938 || Turku || Y. Väisälä || — || align=right | 7.8 km || 
|-id=497 bgcolor=#d6d6d6
| 1497 Tampere ||  ||  || September 22, 1938 || Turku || Y. Väisälä || KOR || align=right | 16 km || 
|-id=498 bgcolor=#d6d6d6
| 1498 Lahti ||  ||  || September 16, 1938 || Turku || Y. Väisälä || MEL || align=right | 32 km || 
|-id=499 bgcolor=#E9E9E9
| 1499 Pori || 1938 UF ||  || October 16, 1938 || Turku || Y. Väisälä || EUN || align=right | 15 km || 
|-id=500 bgcolor=#fefefe
| 1500 Jyväskylä || 1938 UH ||  || October 16, 1938 || Turku || Y. Väisälä || — || align=right | 8.1 km || 
|}

1501–1600 

|-bgcolor=#E9E9E9
| 1501 Baade || 1938 UJ ||  || October 20, 1938 || Hamburg-Bergedorf || A. Wachmann || — || align=right | 11 km || 
|-id=502 bgcolor=#E9E9E9
| 1502 Arenda || 1938 WB ||  || November 17, 1938 || Heidelberg || K. Reinmuth || — || align=right | 36 km || 
|-id=503 bgcolor=#E9E9E9
| 1503 Kuopio || 1938 XD ||  || December 15, 1938 || Turku || Y. Väisälä || EUN || align=right | 23 km || 
|-id=504 bgcolor=#fefefe
| 1504 Lappeenranta || 1939 FM ||  || March 23, 1939 || Turku || L. Oterma || — || align=right | 11 km || 
|-id=505 bgcolor=#E9E9E9
| 1505 Koranna || 1939 HH ||  || April 21, 1939 || Johannesburg || C. Jackson || — || align=right | 22 km || 
|-id=506 bgcolor=#E9E9E9
| 1506 Xosa || 1939 JC ||  || May 15, 1939 || Johannesburg || C. Jackson || slow || align=right | 14 km || 
|-id=507 bgcolor=#fefefe
| 1507 Vaasa || 1939 RD ||  || September 12, 1939 || Turku || L. Oterma || — || align=right | 4.6 km || 
|-id=508 bgcolor=#FA8072
| 1508 Kemi || 1938 UP ||  || October 21, 1938 || Turku || H. Alikoski || — || align=right | 21 km || 
|-id=509 bgcolor=#fefefe
| 1509 Esclangona || 1938 YG ||  || December 21, 1938 || Nice || A. Patry || Hmoon || align=right | 8.2 km || 
|-id=510 bgcolor=#E9E9E9
| 1510 Charlois || 1939 DC ||  || February 22, 1939 || Nice || A. Patry || — || align=right | 25 km || 
|-id=511 bgcolor=#fefefe
| 1511 Daléra || 1939 FB ||  || March 22, 1939 || Algiers || L. Boyer || — || align=right | 14 km || 
|-id=512 bgcolor=#d6d6d6
| 1512 Oulu || 1939 FE ||  || March 18, 1939 || Turku || H. Alikoski || 3:2slow || align=right | 80 km || 
|-id=513 bgcolor=#fefefe
| 1513 Mátra || 1940 EB ||  || March 10, 1940 || Konkoly || G. Kulin || — || align=right | 6.6 km || 
|-id=514 bgcolor=#fefefe
| 1514 Ricouxa || 1906 UR ||  || August 22, 1906 || Heidelberg || M. F. Wolf || FLO || align=right | 7.8 km || 
|-id=515 bgcolor=#E9E9E9
| 1515 Perrotin || 1936 VG ||  || November 15, 1936 || Nice || A. Patry || — || align=right | 6.5 km || 
|-id=516 bgcolor=#E9E9E9
| 1516 Henry || 1938 BG ||  || January 28, 1938 || Nice || A. Patry || — || align=right | 26 km || 
|-id=517 bgcolor=#E9E9E9
| 1517 Beograd || 1938 FD ||  || March 20, 1938 || Belgrade || M. B. Protić || — || align=right | 40 km || 
|-id=518 bgcolor=#fefefe
| 1518 Rovaniemi || 1938 UA ||  || October 15, 1938 || Turku || Y. Väisälä || FLO || align=right | 8.5 km || 
|-id=519 bgcolor=#d6d6d6
| 1519 Kajaani || 1938 UB ||  || October 15, 1938 || Turku || Y. Väisälä || — || align=right | 31 km || 
|-id=520 bgcolor=#d6d6d6
| 1520 Imatra || 1938 UY ||  || October 22, 1938 || Turku || Y. Väisälä || URS || align=right | 53 km || 
|-id=521 bgcolor=#d6d6d6
| 1521 Seinäjoki ||  ||  || October 22, 1938 || Turku || Y. Väisälä || BRA || align=right | 15 km || 
|-id=522 bgcolor=#fefefe
| 1522 Kokkola || 1938 WO ||  || November 18, 1938 || Turku || L. Oterma || — || align=right | 9.4 km || 
|-id=523 bgcolor=#fefefe
| 1523 Pieksämäki || 1939 BC ||  || January 18, 1939 || Turku || Y. Väisälä || FLO || align=right | 9.1 km || 
|-id=524 bgcolor=#d6d6d6
| 1524 Joensuu || 1939 SB ||  || September 18, 1939 || Turku || Y. Väisälä || — || align=right | 45 km || 
|-id=525 bgcolor=#E9E9E9
| 1525 Savonlinna || 1939 SC ||  || September 18, 1939 || Turku || Y. Väisälä || — || align=right | 12 km || 
|-id=526 bgcolor=#fefefe
| 1526 Mikkeli || 1939 TF ||  || October 7, 1939 || Turku || Y. Väisälä || moon || align=right | 5.3 km || 
|-id=527 bgcolor=#fefefe
| 1527 Malmquista || 1939 UG ||  || October 18, 1939 || Turku || Y. Väisälä || FLO || align=right | 10 km || 
|-id=528 bgcolor=#fefefe
| 1528 Conrada || 1940 CA ||  || February 10, 1940 || Heidelberg || K. Reinmuth || — || align=right | 11 km || 
|-id=529 bgcolor=#d6d6d6
| 1529 Oterma || 1938 BC ||  || January 26, 1938 || Turku || Y. Väisälä || HIL3:2 || align=right | 56 km || 
|-id=530 bgcolor=#fefefe
| 1530 Rantaseppä || 1938 SG ||  || September 16, 1938 || Turku || Y. Väisälä || FLO || align=right | 5.0 km || 
|-id=531 bgcolor=#E9E9E9
| 1531 Hartmut || 1938 SH ||  || September 17, 1938 || Heidelberg || A. Bohrmann || EUN || align=right | 10 km || 
|-id=532 bgcolor=#d6d6d6
| 1532 Inari || 1938 SM ||  || September 16, 1938 || Turku || Y. Väisälä || EOS || align=right | 24 km || 
|-id=533 bgcolor=#d6d6d6
| 1533 Saimaa || 1939 BD ||  || January 19, 1939 || Turku || Y. Väisälä || EOS || align=right | 24 km || 
|-id=534 bgcolor=#E9E9E9
| 1534 Näsi || 1939 BK ||  || January 20, 1939 || Turku || Y. Väisälä || CLO || align=right | 22 km || 
|-id=535 bgcolor=#d6d6d6
| 1535 Päijänne || 1939 RC ||  || September 9, 1939 || Turku || Y. Väisälä || — || align=right | 24 km || 
|-id=536 bgcolor=#fefefe
| 1536 Pielinen || 1939 SE ||  || September 18, 1939 || Turku || Y. Väisälä || — || align=right | 8.0 km || 
|-id=537 bgcolor=#d6d6d6
| 1537 Transylvania || 1940 QA ||  || August 27, 1940 || Konkoly || G. Strommer || — || align=right | 20 km || 
|-id=538 bgcolor=#fefefe
| 1538 Detre || 1940 RF ||  || September 8, 1940 || Konkoly || G. Kulin || — || align=right | 6.1 km || 
|-id=539 bgcolor=#d6d6d6
| 1539 Borrelly || 1940 UB ||  || October 29, 1940 || Nice || A. Patry || THM || align=right | 27 km || 
|-id=540 bgcolor=#d6d6d6
| 1540 Kevola || 1938 WK ||  || November 16, 1938 || Turku || L. Oterma || — || align=right | 44 km || 
|-id=541 bgcolor=#E9E9E9
| 1541 Estonia || 1939 CK ||  || February 12, 1939 || Turku || Y. Väisälä || — || align=right | 22 km || 
|-id=542 bgcolor=#d6d6d6
| 1542 Schalén || 1941 QE ||  || August 26, 1941 || Turku || Y. Väisälä || — || align=right | 42 km || 
|-id=543 bgcolor=#E9E9E9
| 1543 Bourgeois || 1941 SJ ||  || September 21, 1941 || Uccle || E. Delporte || — || align=right | 12 km || 
|-id=544 bgcolor=#fefefe
| 1544 Vinterhansenia || 1941 UK ||  || October 15, 1941 || Turku || L. Oterma || — || align=right | 25 km || 
|-id=545 bgcolor=#E9E9E9
| 1545 Thernöe || 1941 UW ||  || October 15, 1941 || Turku || L. Oterma || — || align=right | 19 km || 
|-id=546 bgcolor=#d6d6d6
| 1546 Izsák ||  ||  || September 28, 1941 || Konkoly || G. Kulin || — || align=right | 26 km || 
|-id=547 bgcolor=#E9E9E9
| 1547 Nele || 1929 CZ ||  || February 12, 1929 || Uccle || P. Bourgeois || IAN || align=right | 21 km || 
|-id=548 bgcolor=#E9E9E9
| 1548 Palomaa || 1935 FK ||  || March 26, 1935 || Turku || Y. Väisälä || — || align=right | 31 km || 
|-id=549 bgcolor=#fefefe
| 1549 Mikko || 1937 GA ||  || April 2, 1937 || Turku || Y. Väisälä || FLO || align=right | 10 km || 
|-id=550 bgcolor=#E9E9E9
| 1550 Tito || 1937 WD ||  || November 29, 1937 || Belgrade || M. B. Protić || — || align=right | 11 km || 
|-id=551 bgcolor=#fefefe
| 1551 Argelander ||  ||  || February 24, 1938 || Turku || Y. Väisälä || — || align=right | 10 km || 
|-id=552 bgcolor=#d6d6d6
| 1552 Bessel ||  ||  || February 24, 1938 || Turku || Y. Väisälä || EOS || align=right | 19 km || 
|-id=553 bgcolor=#d6d6d6
| 1553 Bauersfelda || 1940 AD ||  || January 13, 1940 || Heidelberg || K. Reinmuth || — || align=right | 14 km || 
|-id=554 bgcolor=#E9E9E9
| 1554 Yugoslavia || 1940 RE ||  || September 6, 1940 || Belgrade || M. B. Protić || EUN || align=right | 16 km || 
|-id=555 bgcolor=#E9E9E9
| 1555 Dejan || 1941 SA ||  || September 15, 1941 || Uccle || F. Rigaux || — || align=right | 23 km || 
|-id=556 bgcolor=#d6d6d6
| 1556 Wingolfia || 1942 AA ||  || January 14, 1942 || Heidelberg || K. Reinmuth || 7:4 || align=right | 29 km || 
|-id=557 bgcolor=#d6d6d6
| 1557 Roehla || 1942 AD ||  || January 14, 1942 || Heidelberg || K. Reinmuth || EOS || align=right | 19 km || 
|-id=558 bgcolor=#d6d6d6
| 1558 Järnefelt || 1942 BD ||  || January 20, 1942 || Turku || L. Oterma || — || align=right | 55 km || 
|-id=559 bgcolor=#fefefe
| 1559 Kustaanheimo || 1942 BF ||  || January 20, 1942 || Turku || L. Oterma || — || align=right | 11 km || 
|-id=560 bgcolor=#E9E9E9
| 1560 Strattonia || 1942 XB ||  || December 3, 1942 || Uccle || E. Delporte || — || align=right | 24 km || 
|-id=561 bgcolor=#d6d6d6
| 1561 Fricke || 1941 CG ||  || February 15, 1941 || Heidelberg || K. Reinmuth || HYG || align=right | 25 km || 
|-id=562 bgcolor=#fefefe
| 1562 Gondolatsch || 1943 EE ||  || March 9, 1943 || Heidelberg || K. Reinmuth || FLO || align=right | 9.6 km || 
|-id=563 bgcolor=#fefefe
| 1563 Noël || 1943 EG ||  || March 7, 1943 || Uccle || S. Arend || — || align=right | 7.2 km || 
|-id=564 bgcolor=#d6d6d6
| 1564 Srbija || 1936 TB ||  || October 15, 1936 || Belgrade || M. B. Protić || — || align=right | 42 km || 
|-id=565 bgcolor=#FA8072
| 1565 Lemaître || 1948 WA ||  || November 25, 1948 || Uccle || S. Arend || — || align=right | 7.9 km || 
|-id=566 bgcolor=#FFC2E0
| 1566 Icarus || 1949 MA ||  || June 27, 1949 || Palomar || W. Baade || APO +1kmPHA || align=right | 1.0 km || 
|-id=567 bgcolor=#d6d6d6
| 1567 Alikoski || 1941 HN ||  || April 22, 1941 || Turku || Y. Väisälä || — || align=right | 69 km || 
|-id=568 bgcolor=#fefefe
| 1568 Aisleen || 1946 QB ||  || August 21, 1946 || Johannesburg || E. L. Johnson || PHO || align=right | 12 km || 
|-id=569 bgcolor=#d6d6d6
| 1569 Evita || 1948 PA ||  || August 3, 1948 || La Plata Observatory || M. Itzigsohn || — || align=right | 36 km || 
|-id=570 bgcolor=#d6d6d6
| 1570 Brunonia || 1948 TX ||  || October 9, 1948 || Uccle || S. Arend || KOR || align=right | 12 km || 
|-id=571 bgcolor=#d6d6d6
| 1571 Cesco || 1950 FJ ||  || March 20, 1950 || La Plata Observatory || M. Itzigsohn || — || align=right | 18 km || 
|-id=572 bgcolor=#d6d6d6
| 1572 Posnania || 1949 SC ||  || September 22, 1949 || Poznań || J. Dobrzycki, A. Kwiek || — || align=right | 32 km || 
|-id=573 bgcolor=#fefefe
| 1573 Väisälä || 1949 UA ||  || October 27, 1949 || Uccle || S. Arend || PHOslow || align=right | 9.1 km || 
|-id=574 bgcolor=#d6d6d6
| 1574 Meyer || 1949 FD ||  || March 22, 1949 || Algiers || L. Boyer || 7:4 || align=right | 58 km || 
|-id=575 bgcolor=#fefefe
| 1575 Winifred || 1950 HH ||  || April 20, 1950 || Brooklyn || Indiana University || PHOslow || align=right | 9.5 km || 
|-id=576 bgcolor=#d6d6d6
| 1576 Fabiola || 1948 SA ||  || September 30, 1948 || Uccle || S. Arend || THM || align=right | 27 km || 
|-id=577 bgcolor=#fefefe
| 1577 Reiss || 1949 BA ||  || January 19, 1949 || Algiers || L. Boyer || FLO || align=right | 5.6 km || 
|-id=578 bgcolor=#d6d6d6
| 1578 Kirkwood || 1951 AT ||  || January 10, 1951 || Brooklyn || Indiana University || 3:2 || align=right | 47 km || 
|-id=579 bgcolor=#d6d6d6
| 1579 Herrick || 1948 SB ||  || September 30, 1948 || Uccle || S. Arend || 7:4 || align=right | 47 km || 
|-id=580 bgcolor=#FFC2E0
| 1580 Betulia || 1950 KA ||  || May 22, 1950 || Johannesburg || E. L. Johnson || AMO +1km || align=right | 5.8 km || 
|-id=581 bgcolor=#d6d6d6
| 1581 Abanderada ||  ||  || June 15, 1950 || La Plata Observatory || M. Itzigsohn || THMslow? || align=right | 30 km || 
|-id=582 bgcolor=#d6d6d6
| 1582 Martir || 1950 LY ||  || June 15, 1950 || La Plata Observatory || M. Itzigsohn || — || align=right | 37 km || 
|-id=583 bgcolor=#C2FFFF
| 1583 Antilochus || 1950 SA ||  || September 19, 1950 || Uccle || S. Arend || L4 || align=right | 109 km || 
|-id=584 bgcolor=#fefefe
| 1584 Fuji || 1927 CR ||  || February 7, 1927 || Tokyo || O. Oikawa || — || align=right | 19 km || 
|-id=585 bgcolor=#d6d6d6
| 1585 Union || 1947 RG ||  || September 7, 1947 || Johannesburg || E. L. Johnson || — || align=right | 55 km || 
|-id=586 bgcolor=#fefefe
| 1586 Thiele || 1939 CJ ||  || February 13, 1939 || Hamburg-Bergedorf || A. Wachmann || — || align=right | 11 km || 
|-id=587 bgcolor=#E9E9E9
| 1587 Kahrstedt ||  ||  || March 25, 1933 || Heidelberg || K. Reinmuth || RAF || align=right | 15 km || 
|-id=588 bgcolor=#d6d6d6
| 1588 Descamisada || 1951 MH ||  || June 27, 1951 || La Plata Observatory || M. Itzigsohn || EOS || align=right | 18 km || 
|-id=589 bgcolor=#fefefe
| 1589 Fanatica || 1950 RK ||  || September 13, 1950 || La Plata Observatory || M. Itzigsohn || — || align=right | 11 km || 
|-id=590 bgcolor=#fefefe
| 1590 Tsiolkovskaja || 1933 NA ||  || July 1, 1933 || Crimea-Simeis || G. N. Neujmin || FLO || align=right | 10 km || 
|-id=591 bgcolor=#fefefe
| 1591 Baize || 1951 KA ||  || May 31, 1951 || Uccle || S. Arend || PHO || align=right | 14 km || 
|-id=592 bgcolor=#E9E9E9
| 1592 Mathieu || 1951 LA ||  || June 1, 1951 || Uccle || S. Arend || — || align=right | 14 km || 
|-id=593 bgcolor=#FA8072
| 1593 Fagnes || 1951 LB ||  || June 1, 1951 || Uccle || S. Arend || — || align=right | 6.1 km || 
|-id=594 bgcolor=#fefefe
| 1594 Danjon || 1949 WA ||  || November 23, 1949 || Algiers || L. Boyer || — || align=right | 11 km || 
|-id=595 bgcolor=#E9E9E9
| 1595 Tanga || 1930 ME ||  || June 19, 1930 || Johannesburg || C. Jackson, H. E. Wood || — || align=right | 27 km || 
|-id=596 bgcolor=#d6d6d6
| 1596 Itzigsohn || 1951 EV ||  || March 8, 1951 || La Plata Observatory || M. Itzigsohn || — || align=right | 46 km || 
|-id=597 bgcolor=#d6d6d6
| 1597 Laugier || 1949 EB ||  || March 7, 1949 || Algiers || L. Boyer || — || align=right | 13 km || 
|-id=598 bgcolor=#fefefe
| 1598 Paloque || 1950 CA ||  || February 11, 1950 || Algiers || L. Boyer || — || align=right | 9.7 km || 
|-id=599 bgcolor=#d6d6d6
| 1599 Giomus || 1950 WA ||  || November 17, 1950 || Algiers || L. Boyer || HYG || align=right | 41 km || 
|-id=600 bgcolor=#fefefe
| 1600 Vyssotsky || 1947 UC ||  || October 22, 1947 || Mount Hamilton || C. A. Wirtanen || H || align=right | 7.4 km || 
|}

1601–1700 

|-bgcolor=#fefefe
| 1601 Patry || 1942 KA ||  || May 18, 1942 || Algiers || L. Boyer || FLO || align=right | 7.5 km || 
|-id=602 bgcolor=#fefefe
| 1602 Indiana || 1950 GF ||  || March 14, 1950 || Brooklyn || Indiana University || — || align=right | 8.0 km || 
|-id=603 bgcolor=#E9E9E9
| 1603 Neva || 1926 VH ||  || November 4, 1926 || Crimea-Simeis || G. N. Neujmin || — || align=right | 40 km || 
|-id=604 bgcolor=#d6d6d6
| 1604 Tombaugh || 1931 FH ||  || March 24, 1931 || Flagstaff || C. O. Lampland || EOS || align=right | 32 km || 
|-id=605 bgcolor=#d6d6d6
| 1605 Milankovitch || 1936 GA ||  || April 13, 1936 || Uccle || P. Đurković || EOS || align=right | 30 km || 
|-id=606 bgcolor=#E9E9E9
| 1606 Jekhovsky || 1950 RH ||  || September 14, 1950 || Algiers || L. Boyer || slow || align=right | 19 km || 
|-id=607 bgcolor=#E9E9E9
| 1607 Mavis || 1950 RA ||  || September 3, 1950 || Johannesburg || E. L. Johnson || — || align=right | 13 km || 
|-id=608 bgcolor=#fefefe
| 1608 Muñoz || 1951 RZ ||  || September 1, 1951 || La Plata Observatory || M. Itzigsohn || FLO || align=right | 6.7 km || 
|-id=609 bgcolor=#E9E9E9
| 1609 Brenda || 1951 NL ||  || July 10, 1951 || Johannesburg || E. L. Johnson || GER || align=right | 30 km || 
|-id=610 bgcolor=#fefefe
| 1610 Mirnaya || 1928 RT ||  || September 11, 1928 || Crimea-Simeis || P. F. Shajn || — || align=right | 6.1 km || 
|-id=611 bgcolor=#d6d6d6
| 1611 Beyer || 1950 DJ ||  || February 17, 1950 || Heidelberg || K. Reinmuth || HYG || align=right | 24 km || 
|-id=612 bgcolor=#d6d6d6
| 1612 Hirose || 1950 BJ ||  || January 23, 1950 || Heidelberg || K. Reinmuth || — || align=right | 19 km || 
|-id=613 bgcolor=#E9E9E9
| 1613 Smiley || 1950 SD ||  || September 16, 1950 || Uccle || S. Arend || CLO || align=right | 18 km || 
|-id=614 bgcolor=#d6d6d6
| 1614 Goldschmidt || 1952 HA ||  || April 18, 1952 || Uccle || A. Schmitt || — || align=right | 48 km || 
|-id=615 bgcolor=#d6d6d6
| 1615 Bardwell || 1950 BW ||  || January 28, 1950 || Brooklyn || Indiana University || THM || align=right | 29 km || 
|-id=616 bgcolor=#d6d6d6
| 1616 Filipoff || 1950 EA ||  || March 15, 1950 || Algiers || L. Boyer || — || align=right | 24 km || 
|-id=617 bgcolor=#d6d6d6
| 1617 Alschmitt || 1952 FB ||  || March 20, 1952 || Algiers || L. Boyer || — || align=right | 21 km || 
|-id=618 bgcolor=#d6d6d6
| 1618 Dawn || 1948 NF ||  || July 5, 1948 || Johannesburg || E. L. Johnson || KAR || align=right | 17 km || 
|-id=619 bgcolor=#fefefe
| 1619 Ueta || 1953 TA ||  || October 11, 1953 || Kwasan || T. Mitani || FLO || align=right | 9.0 km || 
|-id=620 bgcolor=#FFC2E0
| 1620 Geographos || 1951 RA ||  || September 14, 1951 || Palomar || A. G. Wilson, R. Minkowski || APO +1kmPHA || align=right | 2.6 km || 
|-id=621 bgcolor=#fefefe
| 1621 Druzhba || 1926 TM ||  || October 1, 1926 || Crimea-Simeis || S. Belyavskyj || FLO || align=right | 13 km || 
|-id=622 bgcolor=#fefefe
| 1622 Chacornac || 1952 EA ||  || March 15, 1952 || Uccle || A. Schmitt || FLO || align=right | 8.4 km || 
|-id=623 bgcolor=#d6d6d6
| 1623 Vivian || 1948 PL ||  || August 9, 1948 || Johannesburg || E. L. Johnson || THM || align=right | 28 km || 
|-id=624 bgcolor=#d6d6d6
| 1624 Rabe ||  ||  || October 9, 1931 || Heidelberg || K. Reinmuth || THM || align=right | 26 km || 
|-id=625 bgcolor=#d6d6d6
| 1625 The NORC || 1953 RB ||  || September 1, 1953 || Uccle || S. Arend || — || align=right | 53 km || 
|-id=626 bgcolor=#fefefe
| 1626 Sadeya || 1927 AA ||  || January 10, 1927 || Barcelona || J. Comas i Solà || moon || align=right | 15 km || 
|-id=627 bgcolor=#FFC2E0
| 1627 Ivar || 1929 SH ||  || September 25, 1929 || Johannesburg || E. Hertzsprung || AMO +1km || align=right | 9.1 km || 
|-id=628 bgcolor=#d6d6d6
| 1628 Strobel || 1923 OG ||  || September 11, 1923 || Heidelberg || K. Reinmuth || — || align=right | 59 km || 
|-id=629 bgcolor=#fefefe
| 1629 Pecker || 1952 DB ||  || February 28, 1952 || Algiers || L. Boyer || — || align=right | 8.5 km || 
|-id=630 bgcolor=#d6d6d6
| 1630 Milet || 1952 DA ||  || February 28, 1952 || Algiers || L. Boyer || — || align=right | 19 km || 
|-id=631 bgcolor=#fefefe
| 1631 Kopff || 1936 UC ||  || October 11, 1936 || Turku || Y. Väisälä || — || align=right | 8.6 km || 
|-id=632 bgcolor=#E9E9E9
| 1632 Sieböhme || 1941 DF ||  || February 26, 1941 || Heidelberg || K. Reinmuth || — || align=right | 29 km || 
|-id=633 bgcolor=#d6d6d6
| 1633 Chimay || 1929 EC ||  || March 3, 1929 || Uccle || S. Arend || THM || align=right | 37 km || 
|-id=634 bgcolor=#fefefe
| 1634 Ndola || 1935 QP ||  || August 19, 1935 || Johannesburg || C. Jackson || — || align=right | 9.0 km || 
|-id=635 bgcolor=#d6d6d6
| 1635 Bohrmann || 1924 QW ||  || March 7, 1924 || Heidelberg || K. Reinmuth || KOR || align=right | 17 km || 
|-id=636 bgcolor=#fefefe
| 1636 Porter || 1950 BH ||  || January 23, 1950 || Heidelberg || K. Reinmuth || FLO || align=right | 8.4 km || 
|-id=637 bgcolor=#d6d6d6
| 1637 Swings || 1936 QO ||  || August 28, 1936 || Uccle || J. Hunaerts || — || align=right | 53 km || 
|-id=638 bgcolor=#E9E9E9
| 1638 Ruanda || 1935 JF ||  || May 3, 1935 || Johannesburg || C. Jackson || — || align=right | 19 km || 
|-id=639 bgcolor=#E9E9E9
| 1639 Bower || 1951 RB ||  || September 12, 1951 || Uccle || S. Arend || — || align=right | 36 km || 
|-id=640 bgcolor=#FA8072
| 1640 Nemo || 1951 QA ||  || August 31, 1951 || Uccle || S. Arend || — || align=right | 6.4 km || 
|-id=641 bgcolor=#d6d6d6
| 1641 Tana || 1935 OJ ||  || July 25, 1935 || Johannesburg || C. Jackson || EOS || align=right | 26 km || 
|-id=642 bgcolor=#E9E9E9
| 1642 Hill || 1951 RU ||  || September 4, 1951 || Heidelberg || K. Reinmuth || — || align=right | 16 km || 
|-id=643 bgcolor=#fefefe
| 1643 Brown || 1951 RQ ||  || September 4, 1951 || Heidelberg || K. Reinmuth || — || align=right | 9.5 km || 
|-id=644 bgcolor=#E9E9E9
| 1644 Rafita || 1935 YA ||  || December 16, 1935 || Madrid || R. Carrasco || — || align=right | 14 km || 
|-id=645 bgcolor=#d6d6d6
| 1645 Waterfield || 1933 OJ ||  || July 24, 1933 || Heidelberg || K. Reinmuth || — || align=right | 28 km || 
|-id=646 bgcolor=#fefefe
| 1646 Rosseland || 1939 BG ||  || January 19, 1939 || Turku || Y. Väisälä || — || align=right | 13 km || 
|-id=647 bgcolor=#C2FFFF
| 1647 Menelaus || 1957 MK ||  || June 23, 1957 || Palomar || S. B. Nicholson || L4 || align=right | 43 km || 
|-id=648 bgcolor=#fefefe
| 1648 Shajna || 1935 RF ||  || September 5, 1935 || Crimea-Simeis || P. F. Shajn || — || align=right | 9.5 km || 
|-id=649 bgcolor=#d6d6d6
| 1649 Fabre || 1951 DE ||  || February 27, 1951 || Algiers || L. Boyer || EOS || align=right | 15 km || 
|-id=650 bgcolor=#fefefe
| 1650 Heckmann || 1937 TG ||  || October 11, 1937 || Heidelberg || K. Reinmuth || NYS || align=right | 30 km || 
|-id=651 bgcolor=#fefefe
| 1651 Behrens || 1936 HD ||  || April 23, 1936 || Nice || M. Laugier || FLO || align=right | 9.0 km || 
|-id=652 bgcolor=#fefefe
| 1652 Hergé || 1953 PA ||  || August 9, 1953 || Uccle || S. Arend || — || align=right | 8.7 km || 
|-id=653 bgcolor=#E9E9E9
| 1653 Yakhontovia || 1937 RA ||  || August 30, 1937 || Crimea-Simeis || G. N. Neujmin || — || align=right | 9.0 km || 
|-id=654 bgcolor=#d6d6d6
| 1654 Bojeva || 1931 TL ||  || October 8, 1931 || Crimea-Simeis || P. F. Shajn || EOS || align=right | 25 km || 
|-id=655 bgcolor=#E9E9E9
| 1655 Comas Solà || 1929 WG ||  || November 28, 1929 || Barcelona || J. Comas i Solà || — || align=right | 36 km || 
|-id=656 bgcolor=#FA8072
| 1656 Suomi || 1942 EC ||  || March 11, 1942 || Turku || Y. Väisälä || Hmoon || align=right | 7.9 km || 
|-id=657 bgcolor=#fefefe
| 1657 Roemera || 1961 EA ||  || March 6, 1961 || Zimmerwald || P. Wild || PHO || align=right | 7.7 km || 
|-id=658 bgcolor=#E9E9E9
| 1658 Innes || 1953 NA ||  || July 13, 1953 || Johannesburg || J. A. Bruwer || RAF || align=right | 13 km || 
|-id=659 bgcolor=#E9E9E9
| 1659 Punkaharju || 1940 YL ||  || December 28, 1940 || Turku || Y. Väisälä || POS || align=right | 28 km || 
|-id=660 bgcolor=#fefefe
| 1660 Wood || 1953 GA ||  || April 7, 1953 || Johannesburg || J. A. Bruwer || PHO || align=right | 11 km || 
|-id=661 bgcolor=#fefefe
| 1661 Granule || 1916 FA ||  || March 31, 1916 || Heidelberg || M. F. Wolf || FLO || align=right | 6.1 km || 
|-id=662 bgcolor=#E9E9E9
| 1662 Hoffmann || 1923 RB ||  || September 11, 1923 || Heidelberg || K. Reinmuth || MRX || align=right | 12 km || 
|-id=663 bgcolor=#fefefe
| 1663 van den Bos || 1926 PE ||  || August 4, 1926 || Johannesburg || H. E. Wood || FLOslow || align=right | 14 km || 
|-id=664 bgcolor=#fefefe
| 1664 Felix || 1929 CD ||  || February 4, 1929 || Uccle || E. Delporte || — || align=right | 8.4 km || 
|-id=665 bgcolor=#fefefe
| 1665 Gaby || 1930 DQ ||  || February 27, 1930 || Heidelberg || K. Reinmuth || — || align=right | 11 km || 
|-id=666 bgcolor=#fefefe
| 1666 van Gent || 1930 OG ||  || July 22, 1930 || Johannesburg || H. van Gent || FLO || align=right | 7.7 km || 
|-id=667 bgcolor=#fefefe
| 1667 Pels || 1930 SY ||  || September 16, 1930 || Johannesburg || H. van Gent || FLO || align=right | 9.0 km || 
|-id=668 bgcolor=#E9E9E9
| 1668 Hanna || 1933 OK ||  || July 24, 1933 || Heidelberg || K. Reinmuth || HNA || align=right | 25 km || 
|-id=669 bgcolor=#d6d6d6
| 1669 Dagmar || 1934 RS ||  || September 7, 1934 || Heidelberg || K. Reinmuth || THM || align=right | 42 km || 
|-id=670 bgcolor=#d6d6d6
| 1670 Minnaert || 1934 RZ ||  || September 9, 1934 || Johannesburg || H. van Gent || — || align=right | 21 km || 
|-id=671 bgcolor=#E9E9E9
| 1671 Chaika || 1934 TD ||  || October 3, 1934 || Crimea-Simeis || G. N. Neujmin || — || align=right | 9.4 km || 
|-id=672 bgcolor=#d6d6d6
| 1672 Gezelle || 1935 BD ||  || January 29, 1935 || Uccle || E. Delporte || — || align=right | 26 km || 
|-id=673 bgcolor=#d6d6d6
| 1673 van Houten || 1937 TH ||  || October 11, 1937 || Heidelberg || K. Reinmuth || — || align=right | 21 km || 
|-id=674 bgcolor=#d6d6d6
| 1674 Groeneveld || 1938 DS ||  || February 7, 1938 || Heidelberg || K. Reinmuth || THM || align=right | 32 km || 
|-id=675 bgcolor=#fefefe
| 1675 Simonida || 1938 FB ||  || March 20, 1938 || Belgrade || M. B. Protić || FLO || align=right | 11 km || 
|-id=676 bgcolor=#fefefe
| 1676 Kariba || 1939 LC ||  || June 15, 1939 || Johannesburg || C. Jackson || — || align=right | 7.6 km || 
|-id=677 bgcolor=#E9E9E9
| 1677 Tycho Brahe || 1940 RO ||  || September 6, 1940 || Turku || Y. Väisälä || MAR || align=right | 12 km || 
|-id=678 bgcolor=#d6d6d6
| 1678 Hveen || 1940 YH ||  || December 28, 1940 || Turku || Y. Väisälä || — || align=right | 43 km || 
|-id=679 bgcolor=#d6d6d6
| 1679 Nevanlinna || 1941 FR ||  || March 18, 1941 || Turku || L. Oterma || — || align=right | 53 km || 
|-id=680 bgcolor=#E9E9E9
| 1680 Per Brahe || 1942 CH ||  || February 12, 1942 || Turku || L. Oterma || — || align=right | 14 km || 
|-id=681 bgcolor=#E9E9E9
| 1681 Steinmetz || 1948 WE ||  || November 23, 1948 || Nice || M. Laugier || — || align=right | 16 km || 
|-id=682 bgcolor=#fefefe
| 1682 Karel || 1949 PH ||  || August 2, 1949 || Heidelberg || K. Reinmuth || FLO || align=right | 7.3 km || 
|-id=683 bgcolor=#E9E9E9
| 1683 Castafiore || 1950 SL ||  || September 19, 1950 || Uccle || S. Arend || — || align=right | 21 km || 
|-id=684 bgcolor=#d6d6d6
| 1684 Iguassú || 1951 QE ||  || August 23, 1951 || La Plata Observatory || M. Itzigsohn || — || align=right | 30 km || 
|-id=685 bgcolor=#FFC2E0
| 1685 Toro || 1948 OA ||  || July 17, 1948 || Mount Hamilton || C. A. Wirtanen || APO +1km || align=right | 3.4 km || 
|-id=686 bgcolor=#d6d6d6
| 1686 De Sitter ||  ||  || September 28, 1935 || Johannesburg || H. van Gent || THM || align=right | 30 km || 
|-id=687 bgcolor=#d6d6d6
| 1687 Glarona || 1965 SC ||  || September 19, 1965 || Zimmerwald || P. Wild || THM || align=right | 38 km || 
|-id=688 bgcolor=#E9E9E9
| 1688 Wilkens ||  ||  || March 3, 1951 || La Plata Observatory || M. Itzigsohn || MIT || align=right | 16 km || 
|-id=689 bgcolor=#fefefe
| 1689 Floris-Jan || 1930 SO ||  || September 16, 1930 || Johannesburg || H. van Gent || slow || align=right | 14 km || 
|-id=690 bgcolor=#d6d6d6
| 1690 Mayrhofer || 1948 VB ||  || November 8, 1948 || Nice || M. Laugier || — || align=right | 34 km || 
|-id=691 bgcolor=#d6d6d6
| 1691 Oort || 1956 RB ||  || September 9, 1956 || Heidelberg || K. Reinmuth || THM || align=right | 34 km || 
|-id=692 bgcolor=#E9E9E9
| 1692 Subbotina || 1936 QD ||  || August 16, 1936 || Crimea-Simeis || G. N. Neujmin || — || align=right | 36 km || 
|-id=693 bgcolor=#E9E9E9
| 1693 Hertzsprung || 1935 LA ||  || May 5, 1935 || Johannesburg || H. van Gent || — || align=right | 38 km || 
|-id=694 bgcolor=#fefefe
| 1694 Kaiser || 1934 SB ||  || September 29, 1934 || Johannesburg || H. van Gent || — || align=right | 16 km || 
|-id=695 bgcolor=#E9E9E9
| 1695 Walbeck || 1941 UO ||  || October 15, 1941 || Turku || L. Oterma || — || align=right | 19 km || 
|-id=696 bgcolor=#fefefe
| 1696 Nurmela || 1939 FF ||  || March 18, 1939 || Turku || Y. Väisälä || FLO || align=right | 9.2 km || 
|-id=697 bgcolor=#fefefe
| 1697 Koskenniemi || 1940 RM ||  || September 8, 1940 || Turku || H. Alikoski || V || align=right | 11 km || 
|-id=698 bgcolor=#d6d6d6
| 1698 Christophe || 1934 CS ||  || February 10, 1934 || Uccle || E. Delporte || THM || align=right | 26 km || 
|-id=699 bgcolor=#fefefe
| 1699 Honkasalo || 1941 QD ||  || August 26, 1941 || Turku || Y. Väisälä || — || align=right | 8.3 km || 
|-id=700 bgcolor=#fefefe
| 1700 Zvezdara || 1940 QC ||  || August 26, 1940 || Belgrade || P. Đurković || — || align=right | 20 km || 
|}

1701–1800 

|-bgcolor=#d6d6d6
| 1701 Okavango || 1953 NJ ||  || July 6, 1953 || Johannesburg || J. Churms || — || align=right | 19 km || 
|-id=702 bgcolor=#d6d6d6
| 1702 Kalahari || 1924 NC ||  || July 7, 1924 || Johannesburg || E. Hertzsprung || — || align=right | 35 km || 
|-id=703 bgcolor=#fefefe
| 1703 Barry || 1930 RB ||  || September 2, 1930 || Heidelberg || M. F. Wolf || slow || align=right | 9.2 km || 
|-id=704 bgcolor=#fefefe
| 1704 Wachmann || 1924 EE ||  || March 7, 1924 || Heidelberg || K. Reinmuth || — || align=right | 6.6 km || 
|-id=705 bgcolor=#fefefe
| 1705 Tapio ||  ||  || September 26, 1941 || Turku || L. Oterma || — || align=right | 12 km || 
|-id=706 bgcolor=#fefefe
| 1706 Dieckvoss || 1931 TS ||  || October 5, 1931 || Heidelberg || K. Reinmuth || — || align=right | 6.1 km || 
|-id=707 bgcolor=#fefefe
| 1707 Chantal || 1932 RL ||  || September 8, 1932 || Uccle || E. Delporte || — || align=right | 7.5 km || 
|-id=708 bgcolor=#d6d6d6
| 1708 Pólit || 1929 XA ||  || December 1, 1929 || Barcelona || J. Comas i Solà || — || align=right | 29 km || 
|-id=709 bgcolor=#fefefe
| 1709 Ukraina || 1925 QA ||  || August 16, 1925 || Crimea-Simeis || G. Shajn || — || align=right | 9.4 km || 
|-id=710 bgcolor=#fefefe
| 1710 Gothard || 1941 UF ||  || October 20, 1941 || Konkoly || G. Kulin || — || align=right | 9.8 km || 
|-id=711 bgcolor=#d6d6d6
| 1711 Sandrine || 1935 BB ||  || January 29, 1935 || Uccle || E. Delporte || EOS || align=right | 23 km || 
|-id=712 bgcolor=#d6d6d6
| 1712 Angola || 1935 KC ||  || May 28, 1935 || Johannesburg || C. Jackson || — || align=right | 67 km || 
|-id=713 bgcolor=#fefefe
| 1713 Bancilhon || 1951 SC ||  || September 27, 1951 || Algiers || L. Boyer || — || align=right | 5.7 km || 
|-id=714 bgcolor=#E9E9E9
| 1714 Sy || 1951 OA ||  || July 25, 1951 || Algiers || L. Boyer || — || align=right | 14 km || 
|-id=715 bgcolor=#fefefe
| 1715 Salli || 1938 GK ||  || April 9, 1938 || Turku || H. Alikoski || — || align=right | 24 km || 
|-id=716 bgcolor=#E9E9E9
| 1716 Peter || 1934 GF ||  || April 4, 1934 || Heidelberg || K. Reinmuth || — || align=right | 27 km || 
|-id=717 bgcolor=#fefefe
| 1717 Arlon || 1954 AC ||  || January 8, 1954 || Uccle || S. Arend || moon || align=right | 8.5 km || 
|-id=718 bgcolor=#fefefe
| 1718 Namibia || 1942 RX ||  || September 14, 1942 || Turku || M. Väisälä || — || align=right | 9.7 km || 
|-id=719 bgcolor=#E9E9E9
| 1719 Jens || 1950 DP ||  || February 17, 1950 || Heidelberg || K. Reinmuth || — || align=right | 20 km || 
|-id=720 bgcolor=#fefefe
| 1720 Niels || 1935 CQ ||  || February 7, 1935 || Heidelberg || K. Reinmuth || — || align=right | 6.4 km || 
|-id=721 bgcolor=#d6d6d6
| 1721 Wells ||  ||  || October 3, 1953 || Brooklyn || Indiana University || — || align=right | 44 km || 
|-id=722 bgcolor=#E9E9E9
| 1722 Goffin || 1938 EG ||  || February 23, 1938 || Uccle || E. Delporte || — || align=right | 10 km || 
|-id=723 bgcolor=#d6d6d6
| 1723 Klemola || 1936 FX ||  || March 18, 1936 || Turku || Y. Väisälä || EOS || align=right | 33 km || 
|-id=724 bgcolor=#E9E9E9
| 1724 Vladimir || 1932 DC ||  || February 28, 1932 || Uccle || E. Delporte || — || align=right | 38 km || 
|-id=725 bgcolor=#d6d6d6
| 1725 CrAO || 1930 SK ||  || September 20, 1930 || Crimea-Simeis || G. N. Neujmin || KOR || align=right | 16 km || 
|-id=726 bgcolor=#E9E9E9
| 1726 Hoffmeister || 1933 OE ||  || July 24, 1933 || Heidelberg || K. Reinmuth || HOF || align=right | 25 km || 
|-id=727 bgcolor=#FA8072
| 1727 Mette || 1965 BA ||  || January 25, 1965 || Bloemfontein || A. D. Andrews || Hmoon || align=right | 8.6 km || 
|-id=728 bgcolor=#E9E9E9
| 1728 Goethe Link || 1964 TO ||  || October 12, 1964 || Brooklyn || Indiana University || — || align=right | 15 km || 
|-id=729 bgcolor=#fefefe
| 1729 Beryl || 1963 SL ||  || September 19, 1963 || Brooklyn || Indiana University || — || align=right | 9.0 km || 
|-id=730 bgcolor=#E9E9E9
| 1730 Marceline || 1936 UA ||  || October 17, 1936 || Nice || M. Laugier || — || align=right | 15 km || 
|-id=731 bgcolor=#d6d6d6
| 1731 Smuts || 1948 PH ||  || August 9, 1948 || Johannesburg || E. L. Johnson || — || align=right | 55 km || 
|-id=732 bgcolor=#d6d6d6
| 1732 Heike || 1943 EY ||  || March 9, 1943 || Heidelberg || K. Reinmuth || EOS || align=right | 22 km || 
|-id=733 bgcolor=#fefefe
| 1733 Silke ||  ||  || February 19, 1938 || Heidelberg || A. Bohrmann || FLO || align=right | 6.7 km || 
|-id=734 bgcolor=#E9E9E9
| 1734 Zhongolovich || 1928 TJ ||  || October 11, 1928 || Crimea-Simeis || G. N. Neujmin || DOR || align=right | 26 km || 
|-id=735 bgcolor=#d6d6d6
| 1735 ITA ||  ||  || September 10, 1948 || Crimea-Simeis || P. F. Shajn || — || align=right | 62 km || 
|-id=736 bgcolor=#fefefe
| 1736 Floirac || 1967 RA ||  || September 6, 1967 || Bordeaux || G. Soulié || — || align=right | 8.6 km || 
|-id=737 bgcolor=#d6d6d6
| 1737 Severny || 1966 TJ ||  || October 13, 1966 || Nauchnij || L. I. Chernykh || EOS || align=right | 21 km || 
|-id=738 bgcolor=#fefefe
| 1738 Oosterhoff || 1930 SP ||  || September 16, 1930 || Johannesburg || H. van Gent || FLO || align=right | 7.9 km || 
|-id=739 bgcolor=#fefefe
| 1739 Meyermann || 1939 PF ||  || August 15, 1939 || Heidelberg || K. Reinmuth || — || align=right | 7.9 km || 
|-id=740 bgcolor=#fefefe
| 1740 Paavo Nurmi || 1939 UA ||  || October 18, 1939 || Turku || Y. Väisälä || NYS || align=right | 13 km || 
|-id=741 bgcolor=#d6d6d6
| 1741 Giclas || 1960 BC ||  || January 26, 1960 || Brooklyn || Indiana University || KOR || align=right | 13 km || 
|-id=742 bgcolor=#d6d6d6
| 1742 Schaifers || 1934 RO ||  || September 7, 1934 || Heidelberg || K. Reinmuth || KOR || align=right | 17 km || 
|-id=743 bgcolor=#fefefe
| 1743 Schmidt || 4109 P-L ||  || September 24, 1960 || Palomar || PLS || — || align=right | 19 km || 
|-id=744 bgcolor=#fefefe
| 1744 Harriet || 6557 P-L ||  || September 24, 1960 || Palomar || PLS || — || align=right | 5.0 km || 
|-id=745 bgcolor=#d6d6d6
| 1745 Ferguson ||  ||  || September 17, 1941 || Washington || J. Willis || KOR || align=right | 12 km || 
|-id=746 bgcolor=#d6d6d6
| 1746 Brouwer || 1963 RF ||  || September 14, 1963 || Brooklyn || Indiana University || HIL3:2 || align=right | 63 km || 
|-id=747 bgcolor=#FA8072
| 1747 Wright || 1947 NH ||  || July 14, 1947 || Mount Hamilton || C. A. Wirtanen || — || align=right | 6.4 km || 
|-id=748 bgcolor=#d6d6d6
| 1748 Mauderli || 1966 RA ||  || September 7, 1966 || Zimmerwald || P. Wild || 3:2 || align=right | 45 km || 
|-id=749 bgcolor=#C2FFFF
| 1749 Telamon || 1949 SB ||  || September 23, 1949 || Heidelberg || K. Reinmuth || L4 || align=right | 65 km || 
|-id=750 bgcolor=#FA8072
| 1750 Eckert ||  ||  || July 15, 1950 || Heidelberg || K. Reinmuth || Hslow || align=right | 5.0 km || 
|-id=751 bgcolor=#E9E9E9
| 1751 Herget || 1955 OC ||  || July 27, 1955 || Brooklyn || Indiana University || GEF || align=right | 11 km || 
|-id=752 bgcolor=#fefefe
| 1752 van Herk || 1930 OK ||  || July 22, 1930 || Johannesburg || H. van Gent || FLO || align=right | 4.6 km || 
|-id=753 bgcolor=#d6d6d6
| 1753 Mieke || 1934 JM ||  || May 10, 1934 || Johannesburg || H. van Gent || EOS || align=right | 19 km || 
|-id=754 bgcolor=#d6d6d6
| 1754 Cunningham || 1935 FE ||  || March 29, 1935 || Uccle || E. Delporte || 3:2 || align=right | 80 km || 
|-id=755 bgcolor=#d6d6d6
| 1755 Lorbach || 1936 VD ||  || November 8, 1936 || Nice || M. Laugier || EOS || align=right | 25 km || 
|-id=756 bgcolor=#E9E9E9
| 1756 Giacobini || 1937 YA ||  || December 24, 1937 || Nice || A. Patry || — || align=right | 10 km || 
|-id=757 bgcolor=#fefefe
| 1757 Porvoo || 1939 FC ||  || March 17, 1939 || Turku || Y. Väisälä || — || align=right | 10 km || 
|-id=758 bgcolor=#d6d6d6
| 1758 Naantali || 1942 DK ||  || February 18, 1942 || Turku || L. Oterma || EOS || align=right | 21 km || 
|-id=759 bgcolor=#E9E9E9
| 1759 Kienle || 1942 RF ||  || September 11, 1942 || Heidelberg || K. Reinmuth || — || align=right | 7.3 km || 
|-id=760 bgcolor=#d6d6d6
| 1760 Sandra || 1950 GB ||  || April 10, 1950 || Johannesburg || E. L. Johnson || — || align=right | 35 km || 
|-id=761 bgcolor=#d6d6d6
| 1761 Edmondson || 1952 FN ||  || March 30, 1952 || Brooklyn || Indiana University || — || align=right | 24 km || 
|-id=762 bgcolor=#d6d6d6
| 1762 Russell || 1953 TZ ||  || October 8, 1953 || Brooklyn || Indiana University || KOR || align=right | 17 km || 
|-id=763 bgcolor=#fefefe
| 1763 Williams ||  ||  || October 13, 1953 || Brooklyn || Indiana University || — || align=right | 7.0 km || 
|-id=764 bgcolor=#d6d6d6
| 1764 Cogshall ||  ||  || November 7, 1953 || Brooklyn || Indiana University || THM || align=right | 27 km || 
|-id=765 bgcolor=#d6d6d6
| 1765 Wrubel || 1957 XB ||  || December 15, 1957 || Brooklyn || Indiana University || — || align=right | 38 km || 
|-id=766 bgcolor=#E9E9E9
| 1766 Slipher || 1962 RF ||  || September 7, 1962 || Brooklyn || Indiana University || PAD || align=right | 19 km || 
|-id=767 bgcolor=#d6d6d6
| 1767 Lampland || 1962 RJ ||  || September 7, 1962 || Brooklyn || Indiana University || EOS || align=right | 15 km || 
|-id=768 bgcolor=#fefefe
| 1768 Appenzella || 1965 SA ||  || September 23, 1965 || Zimmerwald || P. Wild || NYS || align=right | 20 km || 
|-id=769 bgcolor=#fefefe
| 1769 Carlostorres || 1966 QP ||  || August 25, 1966 || Córdoba || Z. Pereyra || — || align=right | 5.6 km || 
|-id=770 bgcolor=#fefefe
| 1770 Schlesinger || 1967 JR ||  || May 10, 1967 || El Leoncito || C. U. Cesco, A. R. Klemola || moon || align=right | 11 km || 
|-id=771 bgcolor=#d6d6d6
| 1771 Makover || 1968 BD ||  || January 24, 1968 || Nauchnij || L. I. Chernykh || — || align=right | 47 km || 
|-id=772 bgcolor=#E9E9E9
| 1772 Gagarin || 1968 CB ||  || February 6, 1968 || Nauchnij || L. I. Chernykh || — || align=right | 9.6 km || 
|-id=773 bgcolor=#fefefe
| 1773 Rumpelstilz || 1968 HE ||  || April 17, 1968 || Zimmerwald || P. Wild || slow || align=right | 7.1 km || 
|-id=774 bgcolor=#d6d6d6
| 1774 Kulikov ||  ||  || October 22, 1968 || Nauchnij || T. M. Smirnova || KOR || align=right | 11 km || 
|-id=775 bgcolor=#E9E9E9
| 1775 Zimmerwald || 1969 JA ||  || May 13, 1969 || Zimmerwald || P. Wild || EUNslow || align=right | 10 km || 
|-id=776 bgcolor=#d6d6d6
| 1776 Kuiper || 2520 P-L ||  || September 24, 1960 || Palomar || PLS || EOS || align=right | 40 km || 
|-id=777 bgcolor=#E9E9E9
| 1777 Gehrels || 4007 P-L ||  || September 24, 1960 || Palomar || PLS || — || align=right | 12 km || 
|-id=778 bgcolor=#d6d6d6
| 1778 Alfvén || 4506 P-L ||  || September 26, 1960 || Palomar || PLS || THM || align=right | 21 km || 
|-id=779 bgcolor=#fefefe
| 1779 Paraná || 1950 LZ ||  || June 15, 1950 || La Plata Observatory || M. Itzigsohn || — || align=right | 4.1 km || 
|-id=780 bgcolor=#d6d6d6
| 1780 Kippes || 1906 RA ||  || September 12, 1906 || Heidelberg || A. Kopff || EOS || align=right | 28 km || 
|-id=781 bgcolor=#fefefe
| 1781 Van Biesbroeck || 1906 UB ||  || October 17, 1906 || Heidelberg || A. Kopff || V || align=right | 8.5 km || 
|-id=782 bgcolor=#d6d6d6
| 1782 Schneller ||  ||  || October 6, 1931 || Heidelberg || K. Reinmuth || THM || align=right | 22 km || 
|-id=783 bgcolor=#E9E9E9
| 1783 Albitskij || 1935 FJ ||  || March 24, 1935 || Crimea-Simeis || G. N. Neujmin || ADE || align=right | 24 km || 
|-id=784 bgcolor=#fefefe
| 1784 Benguella || 1935 MG ||  || June 30, 1935 || Johannesburg || C. Jackson || — || align=right | 10 km || 
|-id=785 bgcolor=#fefefe
| 1785 Wurm || 1941 CD ||  || February 15, 1941 || Heidelberg || K. Reinmuth || FLO || align=right | 7.1 km || 
|-id=786 bgcolor=#d6d6d6
| 1786 Raahe || 1948 TL ||  || October 9, 1948 || Turku || H. Alikoski || EOS || align=right | 26 km || 
|-id=787 bgcolor=#d6d6d6
| 1787 Chiny || 1950 SK ||  || September 19, 1950 || Uccle || S. Arend || EOS || align=right | 20 km || 
|-id=788 bgcolor=#d6d6d6
| 1788 Kiess || 1952 OZ ||  || July 25, 1952 || Brooklyn || Indiana University || THM || align=right | 21 km || 
|-id=789 bgcolor=#fefefe
| 1789 Dobrovolsky || 1966 QC ||  || August 19, 1966 || Nauchnij || L. I. Chernykh || — || align=right | 7.9 km || 
|-id=790 bgcolor=#fefefe
| 1790 Volkov || 1967 ER ||  || March 9, 1967 || Nauchnij || L. I. Chernykh || FLO || align=right | 7.1 km || 
|-id=791 bgcolor=#E9E9E9
| 1791 Patsayev || 1967 RE ||  || September 4, 1967 || Nauchnij || T. M. Smirnova || — || align=right | 29 km || 
|-id=792 bgcolor=#E9E9E9
| 1792 Reni || 1968 BG ||  || January 24, 1968 || Nauchnij || L. I. Chernykh || — || align=right | 24 km || 
|-id=793 bgcolor=#fefefe
| 1793 Zoya || 1968 DW ||  || February 28, 1968 || Nauchnij || T. M. Smirnova || — || align=right | 8.3 km || 
|-id=794 bgcolor=#d6d6d6
| 1794 Finsen || 1970 GA ||  || April 7, 1970 || Hartbeespoort || J. A. Bruwer || — || align=right | 38 km || 
|-id=795 bgcolor=#E9E9E9
| 1795 Woltjer || 4010 P-L ||  || September 24, 1960 || Palomar || PLS || DOR || align=right | 24 km || 
|-id=796 bgcolor=#d6d6d6
| 1796 Riga || 1966 KB ||  || May 16, 1966 || Nauchnij || N. S. Chernykh || 7:4 || align=right | 68 km || 
|-id=797 bgcolor=#fefefe
| 1797 Schaumasse || 1936 VH ||  || November 15, 1936 || Nice || A. Patry || — || align=right | 9.1 km || 
|-id=798 bgcolor=#fefefe
| 1798 Watts || 1949 GC ||  || April 4, 1949 || Brooklyn || Indiana University || FLOmoon || align=right | 6.6 km || 
|-id=799 bgcolor=#d6d6d6
| 1799 Koussevitzky || 1950 OE ||  || July 25, 1950 || Brooklyn || Indiana University || — || align=right | 18 km || 
|-id=800 bgcolor=#fefefe
| 1800 Aguilar || 1950 RJ ||  || September 12, 1950 || La Plata Observatory || M. Itzigsohn || — || align=right | 7.4 km || 
|}

1801–1900 

|-bgcolor=#d6d6d6
| 1801 Titicaca ||  ||  || September 23, 1952 || La Plata Observatory || M. Itzigsohn || EOS || align=right | 22 km || 
|-id=802 bgcolor=#d6d6d6
| 1802 Zhang Heng ||  ||  || October 9, 1964 || Nanking || Purple Mountain Obs. || KOR || align=right | 13 km || 
|-id=803 bgcolor=#fefefe
| 1803 Zwicky || 1967 CA ||  || February 6, 1967 || Zimmerwald || P. Wild || PHOmoon || align=right | 9.9 km || 
|-id=804 bgcolor=#fefefe
| 1804 Chebotarev || 1967 GG ||  || April 6, 1967 || Nauchnij || T. M. Smirnova || — || align=right | 9.1 km || 
|-id=805 bgcolor=#d6d6d6
| 1805 Dirikis || 1970 GD ||  || April 1, 1970 || Nauchnij || L. I. Chernykh || THM || align=right | 28 km || 
|-id=806 bgcolor=#fefefe
| 1806 Derice || 1971 LC ||  || June 13, 1971 || Bickley || Perth Obs. || FLO || align=right | 8.0 km || 
|-id=807 bgcolor=#fefefe
| 1807 Slovakia || 1971 QA ||  || August 20, 1971 || Skalnaté Pleso || M. Antal || FLOslow || align=right | 9.1 km || 
|-id=808 bgcolor=#E9E9E9
| 1808 Bellerophon || 2517 P-L ||  || September 24, 1960 || Palomar || PLS || — || align=right | 15 km || 
|-id=809 bgcolor=#d6d6d6
| 1809 Prometheus || 2522 P-L ||  || September 24, 1960 || Palomar || PLS || KOR || align=right | 14 km || 
|-id=810 bgcolor=#fefefe
| 1810 Epimetheus || 4196 P-L ||  || September 24, 1960 || Palomar || PLS || FLO || align=right | 7.7 km || 
|-id=811 bgcolor=#d6d6d6
| 1811 Bruwer || 4576 P-L ||  || September 24, 1960 || Palomar || PLS || — || align=right | 28 km || 
|-id=812 bgcolor=#d6d6d6
| 1812 Gilgamesh || 4645 P-L ||  || September 24, 1960 || Palomar || PLS || EOS || align=right | 15 km || 
|-id=813 bgcolor=#E9E9E9
| 1813 Imhotep || 7589 P-L ||  || October 17, 1960 || Palomar || PLS || — || align=right | 19 km || 
|-id=814 bgcolor=#fefefe
| 1814 Bach ||  ||  || October 9, 1931 || Heidelberg || K. Reinmuth || — || align=right | 7.5 km || 
|-id=815 bgcolor=#d6d6d6
| 1815 Beethoven ||  ||  || January 27, 1932 || Heidelberg || K. Reinmuth || — || align=right | 31 km || 
|-id=816 bgcolor=#fefefe
| 1816 Liberia || 1936 BD ||  || January 29, 1936 || Johannesburg || C. Jackson || PHO || align=right | 9.8 km || 
|-id=817 bgcolor=#fefefe
| 1817 Katanga || 1939 MB ||  || June 20, 1939 || Johannesburg || C. Jackson || — || align=right | 16 km || 
|-id=818 bgcolor=#fefefe
| 1818 Brahms || 1939 PE ||  || August 15, 1939 || Heidelberg || K. Reinmuth || — || align=right | 14 km || 
|-id=819 bgcolor=#d6d6d6
| 1819 Laputa || 1948 PC ||  || August 9, 1948 || Johannesburg || E. L. Johnson || — || align=right | 54 km || 
|-id=820 bgcolor=#fefefe
| 1820 Lohmann || 1949 PO ||  || August 2, 1949 || Heidelberg || K. Reinmuth || FLO || align=right | 5.3 km || 
|-id=821 bgcolor=#fefefe
| 1821 Aconcagua || 1950 MB ||  || June 24, 1950 || La Plata Observatory || M. Itzigsohn || — || align=right | 6.4 km || 
|-id=822 bgcolor=#fefefe
| 1822 Waterman || 1950 OO ||  || July 25, 1950 || Brooklyn || Indiana University || — || align=right | 6.1 km || 
|-id=823 bgcolor=#fefefe
| 1823 Gliese || 1951 RD ||  || September 4, 1951 || Heidelberg || K. Reinmuth || — || align=right | 8.4 km || 
|-id=824 bgcolor=#d6d6d6
| 1824 Haworth || 1952 FM ||  || March 30, 1952 || Brooklyn || Indiana University || KOR || align=right | 14 km || 
|-id=825 bgcolor=#E9E9E9
| 1825 Klare || 1954 QH ||  || August 31, 1954 || Heidelberg || K. Reinmuth || — || align=right | 18 km || 
|-id=826 bgcolor=#d6d6d6
| 1826 Miller ||  ||  || September 14, 1955 || Brooklyn || Indiana University || EOS || align=right | 23 km || 
|-id=827 bgcolor=#E9E9E9
| 1827 Atkinson || 1962 RK ||  || September 7, 1962 || Brooklyn || Indiana University || — || align=right | 8.9 km || 
|-id=828 bgcolor=#d6d6d6
| 1828 Kashirina || 1966 PH ||  || August 14, 1966 || Nauchnij || L. I. Chernykh || — || align=right | 27 km || 
|-id=829 bgcolor=#fefefe
| 1829 Dawson || 1967 JJ ||  || May 6, 1967 || El Leoncito || C. U. Cesco, A. R. Klemola || FLO || align=right | 8.1 km || 
|-id=830 bgcolor=#fefefe
| 1830 Pogson || 1968 HA ||  || April 17, 1968 || Zimmerwald || P. Wild || FLOmoon || align=right | 7.7 km || 
|-id=831 bgcolor=#fefefe
| 1831 Nicholson || 1968 HC ||  || April 17, 1968 || Zimmerwald || P. Wild || FLO || align=right | 8.1 km || 
|-id=832 bgcolor=#d6d6d6
| 1832 Mrkos || 1969 PC ||  || August 11, 1969 || Nauchnij || L. I. Chernykh || — || align=right | 29 km || 
|-id=833 bgcolor=#E9E9E9
| 1833 Shmakova || 1969 PN ||  || August 11, 1969 || Nauchnij || L. I. Chernykh || — || align=right | 17 km || 
|-id=834 bgcolor=#d6d6d6
| 1834 Palach || 1969 QP ||  || August 22, 1969 || Hamburg-Bergedorf || L. Kohoutek || EOS || align=right | 17 km || 
|-id=835 bgcolor=#d6d6d6
| 1835 Gajdariya || 1970 OE ||  || July 30, 1970 || Nauchnij || T. M. Smirnova || KOR || align=right | 13 km || 
|-id=836 bgcolor=#E9E9E9
| 1836 Komarov || 1971 OT ||  || July 26, 1971 || Nauchnij || N. S. Chernykh || DOR || align=right | 22 km || 
|-id=837 bgcolor=#fefefe
| 1837 Osita ||  ||  || August 16, 1971 || El Leoncito || J. Gibson || — || align=right | 7.5 km || 
|-id=838 bgcolor=#d6d6d6
| 1838 Ursa || 1971 UC ||  || October 20, 1971 || Zimmerwald || P. Wild || ALA || align=right | 40 km || 
|-id=839 bgcolor=#E9E9E9
| 1839 Ragazza || 1971 UF ||  || October 20, 1971 || Zimmerwald || P. Wild || GEFslow || align=right | 8.8 km || 
|-id=840 bgcolor=#d6d6d6
| 1840 Hus || 1971 UY ||  || October 26, 1971 || Hamburg-Bergedorf || L. Kohoutek || KOR || align=right | 12 km || 
|-id=841 bgcolor=#d6d6d6
| 1841 Masaryk ||  ||  || October 26, 1971 || Hamburg-Bergedorf || L. Kohoutek || 7:4 || align=right | 40 km || 
|-id=842 bgcolor=#fefefe
| 1842 Hynek || 1972 AA ||  || January 14, 1972 || Hamburg-Bergedorf || L. Kohoutek || FLO || align=right | 8.0 km || 
|-id=843 bgcolor=#E9E9E9
| 1843 Jarmila || 1972 AB ||  || January 14, 1972 || Hamburg-Bergedorf || L. Kohoutek || — || align=right | 29 km || 
|-id=844 bgcolor=#d6d6d6
| 1844 Susilva || 1972 UB ||  || October 30, 1972 || Zimmerwald || P. Wild || EOS || align=right | 27 km || 
|-id=845 bgcolor=#d6d6d6
| 1845 Helewalda || 1972 UC ||  || October 30, 1972 || Zimmerwald || P. Wild || EOS || align=right | 20 km || 
|-id=846 bgcolor=#fefefe
| 1846 Bengt || 6553 P-L ||  || September 24, 1960 || Palomar || PLS || — || align=right | 11 km || 
|-id=847 bgcolor=#E9E9E9
| 1847 Stobbe || 1916 CA ||  || February 1, 1916 || Hamburg-Bergedorf || H. Thiele || — || align=right | 17 km || 
|-id=848 bgcolor=#d6d6d6
| 1848 Delvaux || 1933 QD ||  || August 18, 1933 || Uccle || E. Delporte || — || align=right | 17 km || 
|-id=849 bgcolor=#d6d6d6
| 1849 Kresák || 1942 AB ||  || January 14, 1942 || Heidelberg || K. Reinmuth || EOS || align=right | 22 km || 
|-id=850 bgcolor=#fefefe
| 1850 Kohoutek || 1942 EN ||  || March 23, 1942 || Heidelberg || K. Reinmuth || FLO || align=right | 7.6 km || 
|-id=851 bgcolor=#d6d6d6
| 1851 Lacroute || 1950 VA ||  || November 9, 1950 || Algiers || L. Boyer || THM || align=right | 17 km || 
|-id=852 bgcolor=#d6d6d6
| 1852 Carpenter || 1955 GA ||  || April 1, 1955 || Brooklyn || Indiana University || EOS || align=right | 21 km || 
|-id=853 bgcolor=#d6d6d6
| 1853 McElroy || 1957 XE ||  || December 15, 1957 || Brooklyn || Indiana University || — || align=right | 24 km || 
|-id=854 bgcolor=#E9E9E9
| 1854 Skvortsov ||  ||  || October 22, 1968 || Nauchnij || T. M. Smirnova || — || align=right | 9.6 km || 
|-id=855 bgcolor=#fefefe
| 1855 Korolev ||  ||  || October 8, 1969 || Nauchnij || L. I. Chernykh || FLO || align=right | 6.8 km || 
|-id=856 bgcolor=#fefefe
| 1856 Růžena ||  ||  || October 8, 1969 || Nauchnij || L. I. Chernykh || — || align=right | 6.6 km || 
|-id=857 bgcolor=#fefefe
| 1857 Parchomenko ||  ||  || August 30, 1971 || Nauchnij || T. M. Smirnova || FLO || align=right | 8.0 km || 
|-id=858 bgcolor=#E9E9E9
| 1858 Lobachevskij || 1972 QL ||  || August 18, 1972 || Nauchnij || L. V. Zhuravleva || — || align=right | 11 km || 
|-id=859 bgcolor=#d6d6d6
| 1859 Kovalevskaya ||  ||  || September 4, 1972 || Nauchnij || L. V. Zhuravleva || — || align=right | 45 km || 
|-id=860 bgcolor=#E9E9E9
| 1860 Barbarossa || 1973 SK ||  || September 28, 1973 || Zimmerwald || P. Wild || — || align=right | 17 km || 
|-id=861 bgcolor=#d6d6d6
| 1861 Komenský || 1970 WB ||  || November 24, 1970 || Hamburg-Bergedorf || L. Kohoutek || EOS || align=right | 15 km || 
|-id=862 bgcolor=#FFC2E0
| 1862 Apollo || 1932 HA ||  || April 24, 1932 || Heidelberg || K. Reinmuth || APO +1kmPHAmoon || align=right | 1.5 km || 
|-id=863 bgcolor=#FFC2E0
| 1863 Antinous || 1948 EA ||  || March 7, 1948 || Mount Hamilton || C. A. Wirtanen || APO +1km || align=right | 2.1 km || 
|-id=864 bgcolor=#FFC2E0
| 1864 Daedalus || 1971 FA ||  || March 24, 1971 || Palomar || T. Gehrels || APO +1km || align=right | 3.7 km || 
|-id=865 bgcolor=#FFC2E0
| 1865 Cerberus || 1971 UA ||  || October 26, 1971 || Hamburg-Bergedorf || L. Kohoutek || APO +1km || align=right | 1.2 km || 
|-id=866 bgcolor=#FFC2E0
| 1866 Sisyphus || 1972 XA ||  || December 5, 1972 || Zimmerwald || P. Wild || APO +1kmmoon || align=right | 8.5 km || 
|-id=867 bgcolor=#C2FFFF
| 1867 Deiphobus || 1971 EA ||  || March 3, 1971 || El Leoncito || C. U. Cesco || L5ENM || align=right | 118 km || 
|-id=868 bgcolor=#C2FFFF
| 1868 Thersites || 2008 P-L ||  || September 24, 1960 || Palomar || PLS || L4 || align=right | 68 km || 
|-id=869 bgcolor=#C2FFFF
| 1869 Philoctetes || 4596 P-L ||  || September 24, 1960 || Palomar || PLS || L4 || align=right | 23 km || 
|-id=870 bgcolor=#C2FFFF
| 1870 Glaukos || 1971 FE ||  || March 24, 1971 || Palomar || PLS || L5 || align=right | 48 km || 
|-id=871 bgcolor=#C2FFFF
| 1871 Astyanax || 1971 FF ||  || March 24, 1971 || Palomar || PLS || L5 || align=right | 28 km || 
|-id=872 bgcolor=#C2FFFF
| 1872 Helenos || 1971 FG ||  || March 24, 1971 || Palomar || PLS || L5 || align=right | 34 km || 
|-id=873 bgcolor=#C2FFFF
| 1873 Agenor || 1971 FH ||  || March 25, 1971 || Palomar || PLS || L5 || align=right | 51 km || 
|-id=874 bgcolor=#d6d6d6
| 1874 Kacivelia || 1924 RC ||  || September 5, 1924 || Crimea-Simeis || S. Belyavskyj || — || align=right | 21 km || 
|-id=875 bgcolor=#d6d6d6
| 1875 Neruda || 1969 QQ ||  || August 22, 1969 || Hamburg-Bergedorf || L. Kohoutek || — || align=right | 19 km || 
|-id=876 bgcolor=#fefefe
| 1876 Napolitania || 1970 BA ||  || January 31, 1970 || Palomar || C. T. Kowal || H || align=right | 2.8 km || 
|-id=877 bgcolor=#d6d6d6
| 1877 Marsden || 1971 FC ||  || March 24, 1971 || Palomar || T. Gehrels || 3:2 || align=right | 36 km || 
|-id=878 bgcolor=#d6d6d6
| 1878 Hughes || 1933 QC ||  || August 18, 1933 || Uccle || E. Delporte || KOR || align=right | 12 km || 
|-id=879 bgcolor=#fefefe
| 1879 Broederstroom || 1935 UN ||  || October 16, 1935 || Johannesburg || H. van Gent || — || align=right | 7.4 km || 
|-id=880 bgcolor=#E9E9E9
| 1880 McCrosky || 1940 AN ||  || January 13, 1940 || Heidelberg || K. Reinmuth || — || align=right | 15 km || 
|-id=881 bgcolor=#d6d6d6
| 1881 Shao || 1940 PC ||  || August 3, 1940 || Heidelberg || K. Reinmuth || — || align=right | 24 km || 
|-id=882 bgcolor=#d6d6d6
| 1882 Rauma || 1941 UJ ||  || October 15, 1941 || Turku || L. Oterma || EOS || align=right | 18 km || 
|-id=883 bgcolor=#fefefe
| 1883 Rimito || 1942 XA ||  || December 4, 1942 || Turku || Y. Väisälä || PHO || align=right | 5.7 km || 
|-id=884 bgcolor=#fefefe
| 1884 Skip ||  ||  || March 2, 1943 || Nice || M. Laugier || — || align=right | 8.4 km || 
|-id=885 bgcolor=#fefefe
| 1885 Herero || 1948 PJ ||  || August 9, 1948 || Johannesburg || E. L. Johnson || — || align=right | 4.7 km || 
|-id=886 bgcolor=#E9E9E9
| 1886 Lowell || 1949 MP ||  || June 21, 1949 || Flagstaff || H. L. Giclas || — || align=right | 15 km || 
|-id=887 bgcolor=#d6d6d6
| 1887 Virton || 1950 TD ||  || October 5, 1950 || Uccle || S. Arend || EOS || align=right | 21 km || 
|-id=888 bgcolor=#E9E9E9
| 1888 Zu Chong-Zhi ||  ||  || November 9, 1964 || Nanking || Purple Mountain Obs. || — || align=right | 12 km || 
|-id=889 bgcolor=#d6d6d6
| 1889 Pakhmutova || 1968 BE ||  || January 24, 1968 || Nauchnij || L. I. Chernykh || — || align=right | 35 km || 
|-id=890 bgcolor=#d6d6d6
| 1890 Konoshenkova || 1968 CD ||  || February 6, 1968 || Nauchnij || L. I. Chernykh || — || align=right | 26 km || 
|-id=891 bgcolor=#E9E9E9
| 1891 Gondola || 1969 RA ||  || September 11, 1969 || Zimmerwald || P. Wild || — || align=right | 12 km || 
|-id=892 bgcolor=#fefefe
| 1892 Lucienne || 1971 SD ||  || September 16, 1971 || Zimmerwald || P. Wild || LCI || align=right | 9.7 km || 
|-id=893 bgcolor=#E9E9E9
| 1893 Jakoba || 1971 UD ||  || October 20, 1971 || Zimmerwald || P. Wild || — || align=right | 13 km || 
|-id=894 bgcolor=#d6d6d6
| 1894 Haffner || 1971 UH ||  || October 26, 1971 || Hamburg-Bergedorf || L. Kohoutek || KOR || align=right | 11 km || 
|-id=895 bgcolor=#d6d6d6
| 1895 Larink || 1971 UZ ||  || October 26, 1971 || Hamburg-Bergedorf || L. Kohoutek || THM || align=right | 20 km || 
|-id=896 bgcolor=#fefefe
| 1896 Beer ||  ||  || October 26, 1971 || Hamburg-Bergedorf || L. Kohoutek || NYS || align=right | 5.4 km || 
|-id=897 bgcolor=#fefefe
| 1897 Hind ||  ||  || October 26, 1971 || Hamburg-Bergedorf || L. Kohoutek || — || align=right | 5.0 km || 
|-id=898 bgcolor=#d6d6d6
| 1898 Cowell ||  ||  || October 26, 1971 || Hamburg-Bergedorf || L. Kohoutek || THM || align=right | 15 km || 
|-id=899 bgcolor=#fefefe
| 1899 Crommelin ||  ||  || October 26, 1971 || Hamburg-Bergedorf || L. Kohoutek || FLO || align=right | 5.3 km || 
|-id=900 bgcolor=#fefefe
| 1900 Katyusha || 1971 YB ||  || December 16, 1971 || Nauchnij || T. M. Smirnova || — || align=right | 8.8 km || 
|}

1901–2000 

|-bgcolor=#d6d6d6
| 1901 Moravia || 1972 AD ||  || January 14, 1972 || Hamburg-Bergedorf || L. Kohoutek || ALA || align=right | 28 km || 
|-id=902 bgcolor=#d6d6d6
| 1902 Shaposhnikov || 1972 HU ||  || April 18, 1972 || Nauchnij || T. M. Smirnova || 3:2 || align=right | 83 km || 
|-id=903 bgcolor=#d6d6d6
| 1903 Adzhimushkaj || 1972 JL ||  || May 9, 1972 || Nauchnij || T. M. Smirnova || EOS || align=right | 28 km || 
|-id=904 bgcolor=#E9E9E9
| 1904 Massevitch || 1972 JM ||  || May 9, 1972 || Nauchnij || T. M. Smirnova || — || align=right | 14 km || 
|-id=905 bgcolor=#fefefe
| 1905 Ambartsumian || 1972 JZ ||  || May 14, 1972 || Nauchnij || T. M. Smirnova || — || align=right | 8.0 km || 
|-id=906 bgcolor=#fefefe
| 1906 Naef || 1972 RC ||  || September 5, 1972 || Zimmerwald || P. Wild || V || align=right | 7.9 km || 
|-id=907 bgcolor=#E9E9E9
| 1907 Rudneva ||  ||  || September 11, 1972 || Nauchnij || N. S. Chernykh || — || align=right | 11 km || 
|-id=908 bgcolor=#d6d6d6
| 1908 Pobeda ||  ||  || September 11, 1972 || Nauchnij || N. S. Chernykh || — || align=right | 18 km || 
|-id=909 bgcolor=#fefefe
| 1909 Alekhin ||  ||  || September 4, 1972 || Nauchnij || L. V. Zhuravleva || slow || align=right | 19 km || 
|-id=910 bgcolor=#d6d6d6
| 1910 Mikhailov ||  ||  || October 8, 1972 || Nauchnij || L. V. Zhuravleva || — || align=right | 37 km || 
|-id=911 bgcolor=#d6d6d6
| 1911 Schubart || 1973 UD ||  || October 25, 1973 || Zimmerwald || P. Wild || SHU3:2 || align=right | 67 km || 
|-id=912 bgcolor=#d6d6d6
| 1912 Anubis || 6534 P-L ||  || September 24, 1960 || Palomar || PLS || KOR || align=right | 10 km || 
|-id=913 bgcolor=#d6d6d6
| 1913 Sekanina || 1928 SF ||  || September 22, 1928 || Heidelberg || K. Reinmuth || KOR || align=right | 13 km || 
|-id=914 bgcolor=#fefefe
| 1914 Hartbeespoortdam ||  ||  || September 28, 1930 || Johannesburg || H. van Gent || — || align=right | 9.6 km || 
|-id=915 bgcolor=#FFC2E0
| 1915 Quetzálcoatl || 1953 EA ||  || March 9, 1953 || Palomar || A. G. Wilson || AMOcritical || align=right data-sort-value="0.5" | 500 m || 
|-id=916 bgcolor=#FFC2E0
| 1916 Boreas || 1953 RA ||  || September 1, 1953 || Uccle || S. Arend || AMO +1km || align=right | 3.5 km || 
|-id=917 bgcolor=#FFC2E0
| 1917 Cuyo || 1968 AA ||  || January 1, 1968 || El Leoncito || C. U. Cesco, A. G. Samuel || AMO +1km || align=right | 5.7 km || 
|-id=918 bgcolor=#d6d6d6
| 1918 Aiguillon || 1968 UA ||  || October 19, 1968 || Bordeaux || G. Soulié || — || align=right | 20 km || 
|-id=919 bgcolor=#fefefe
| 1919 Clemence || 1971 SA ||  || September 16, 1971 || El Leoncito || J. Gibson, C. U. Cesco || H || align=right | 3.3 km || 
|-id=920 bgcolor=#fefefe
| 1920 Sarmiento || 1971 VO ||  || November 11, 1971 || El Leoncito || J. Gibson, C. U. Cesco || H || align=right | 2.9 km || 
|-id=921 bgcolor=#d6d6d6
| 1921 Pala || 1973 SE ||  || September 20, 1973 || Palomar || T. Gehrels || 2:1J || align=right | 6.2 km || 
|-id=922 bgcolor=#d6d6d6
| 1922 Zulu || 1949 HC ||  || April 25, 1949 || Johannesburg || E. L. Johnson || 2:1J || align=right | 21 km || 
|-id=923 bgcolor=#fefefe
| 1923 Osiris || 4011 P-L ||  || September 24, 1960 || Palomar || PLS || SUL || align=right | 13 km || 
|-id=924 bgcolor=#fefefe
| 1924 Horus || 4023 P-L ||  || September 24, 1960 || Palomar || PLS || NYS || align=right | 13 km || 
|-id=925 bgcolor=#E9E9E9
| 1925 Franklin-Adams || 1934 RY ||  || September 9, 1934 || Johannesburg || H. van Gent || — || align=right | 8.9 km || 
|-id=926 bgcolor=#E9E9E9
| 1926 Demiddelaer || 1935 JA ||  || May 2, 1935 || Uccle || E. Delporte || EUN || align=right | 18 km || 
|-id=927 bgcolor=#E9E9E9
| 1927 Suvanto || 1936 FP ||  || March 18, 1936 || Turku || R. Suvanto || — || align=right | 12 km || 
|-id=928 bgcolor=#fefefe
| 1928 Summa || 1938 SO ||  || September 21, 1938 || Turku || Y. Väisälä || — || align=right | 9.3 km || 
|-id=929 bgcolor=#fefefe
| 1929 Kollaa || 1939 BS ||  || January 20, 1939 || Turku || Y. Väisälä || V || align=right | 7.8 km || 
|-id=930 bgcolor=#d6d6d6
| 1930 Lucifer || 1964 UA ||  || October 29, 1964 || USNO Flagstaff || E. Roemer || — || align=right | 34 km || 
|-id=931 bgcolor=#E9E9E9
| 1931 Čapek || 1969 QB ||  || August 22, 1969 || Hamburg-Bergedorf || L. Kohoutek || — || align=right | 6.6 km || 
|-id=932 bgcolor=#fefefe
| 1932 Jansky ||  ||  || October 26, 1971 || Hamburg-Bergedorf || L. Kohoutek || NYS || align=right | 5.4 km || 
|-id=933 bgcolor=#fefefe
| 1933 Tinchen || 1972 AC ||  || January 14, 1972 || Hamburg-Bergedorf || L. Kohoutek || V || align=right | 4.5 km || 
|-id=934 bgcolor=#fefefe
| 1934 Jeffers || 1972 XB ||  || December 2, 1972 || Mount Hamilton || A. R. Klemola || PHOmoon || align=right | 9.2 km || 
|-id=935 bgcolor=#E9E9E9
| 1935 Lucerna || 1973 RB ||  || September 2, 1973 || Zimmerwald || P. Wild || — || align=right | 6.4 km || 
|-id=936 bgcolor=#E9E9E9
| 1936 Lugano || 1973 WD ||  || November 24, 1973 || Zimmerwald || P. Wild || ADE || align=right | 34 km || 
|-id=937 bgcolor=#fefefe
| 1937 Locarno || 1973 YA ||  || December 19, 1973 || Zimmerwald || P. Wild || — || align=right | 13 km || 
|-id=938 bgcolor=#fefefe
| 1938 Lausanna || 1974 HC ||  || April 19, 1974 || Zimmerwald || P. Wild || — || align=right | 7.6 km || 
|-id=939 bgcolor=#d6d6d6
| 1939 Loretta || 1974 UC ||  || October 17, 1974 || Palomar || C. T. Kowal || THM || align=right | 30 km || 
|-id=940 bgcolor=#d6d6d6
| 1940 Whipple || 1975 CA ||  || February 2, 1975 || Harvard Observatory || Harvard Obs. || — || align=right | 37 km || 
|-id=941 bgcolor=#d6d6d6
| 1941 Wild ||  ||  || October 6, 1931 || Heidelberg || K. Reinmuth || SHU3:2 || align=right | 17 km || 
|-id=942 bgcolor=#fefefe
| 1942 Jablunka || 1972 SA ||  || September 30, 1972 || Hamburg-Bergedorf || L. Kohoutek || PHO || align=right | 17 km || 
|-id=943 bgcolor=#FFC2E0
| 1943 Anteros || 1973 EC ||  || March 13, 1973 || El Leoncito || J. Gibson || AMO +1km || align=right | 2.3 km || 
|-id=944 bgcolor=#fefefe
| 1944 Günter || 1925 RA ||  || September 14, 1925 || Heidelberg || K. Reinmuth || — || align=right | 4.9 km || 
|-id=945 bgcolor=#E9E9E9
| 1945 Wesselink || 1930 OL ||  || July 22, 1930 || Johannesburg || H. van Gent || — || align=right | 7.2 km || 
|-id=946 bgcolor=#fefefe
| 1946 Walraven || 1931 PH ||  || August 8, 1931 || Johannesburg || H. van Gent || — || align=right | 9.2 km || 
|-id=947 bgcolor=#d6d6d6
| 1947 Iso-Heikkilä || 1935 EA ||  || March 4, 1935 || Turku || Y. Väisälä || EOS || align=right | 32 km || 
|-id=948 bgcolor=#E9E9E9
| 1948 Kampala || 1935 GL ||  || April 3, 1935 || Johannesburg || C. Jackson || — || align=right | 7.8 km || 
|-id=949 bgcolor=#fefefe
| 1949 Messina || 1936 NE ||  || July 8, 1936 || Johannesburg || C. Jackson || — || align=right | 3.6 km || 
|-id=950 bgcolor=#fefefe
| 1950 Wempe || 1942 EO ||  || March 23, 1942 || Heidelberg || K. Reinmuth || — || align=right | 6.3 km || 
|-id=951 bgcolor=#FA8072
| 1951 Lick || 1949 OA ||  || July 26, 1949 || Mount Hamilton || C. A. Wirtanen || — || align=right | 5.6 km || 
|-id=952 bgcolor=#d6d6d6
| 1952 Hesburgh || 1951 JC ||  || May 3, 1951 || Brooklyn || Indiana University || — || align=right | 38 km || 
|-id=953 bgcolor=#d6d6d6
| 1953 Rupertwildt || 1951 UK ||  || October 29, 1951 || Brooklyn || Indiana University || THM || align=right | 22 km || 
|-id=954 bgcolor=#d6d6d6
| 1954 Kukarkin || 1952 PH ||  || August 15, 1952 || Crimea-Simeis || P. F. Shajn || slow || align=right | 14 km || 
|-id=955 bgcolor=#d6d6d6
| 1955 McMath || 1963 SR ||  || September 22, 1963 || Brooklyn || Indiana University || KOR || align=right | 9.8 km || 
|-id=956 bgcolor=#d6d6d6
| 1956 Artek ||  ||  || October 8, 1969 || Nauchnij || L. I. Chernykh || THM || align=right | 20 km || 
|-id=957 bgcolor=#d6d6d6
| 1957 Angara || 1970 GF ||  || April 1, 1970 || Nauchnij || L. I. Chernykh || EOS || align=right | 18 km || 
|-id=958 bgcolor=#d6d6d6
| 1958 Chandra || 1970 SB ||  || September 24, 1970 || El Leoncito || C. U. Cesco || — || align=right | 34 km || 
|-id=959 bgcolor=#fefefe
| 1959 Karbyshev || 1972 NB ||  || July 14, 1972 || Nauchnij || L. V. Zhuravleva || V || align=right | 6.9 km || 
|-id=960 bgcolor=#E9E9E9
| 1960 Guisan || 1973 UA ||  || October 25, 1973 || Zimmerwald || P. Wild || — || align=right | 27 km || 
|-id=961 bgcolor=#d6d6d6
| 1961 Dufour || 1973 WA ||  || November 19, 1973 || Zimmerwald || P. Wild || — || align=right | 50 km || 
|-id=962 bgcolor=#d6d6d6
| 1962 Dunant || 1973 WE ||  || November 24, 1973 || Zimmerwald || P. Wild || — || align=right | 19 km || 
|-id=963 bgcolor=#fefefe
| 1963 Bezovec || 1975 CB ||  || February 9, 1975 || Hamburg-Bergedorf || L. Kohoutek || PHO || align=right | 36 km || 
|-id=964 bgcolor=#fefefe
| 1964 Luyten || 2007 P-L ||  || September 24, 1960 || Palomar || PLS || — || align=right | 8.4 km || 
|-id=965 bgcolor=#E9E9E9
| 1965 van de Kamp || 2521 P-L ||  || September 24, 1960 || Palomar || PLS || — || align=right | 14 km || 
|-id=966 bgcolor=#fefefe
| 1966 Tristan || 2552 P-L ||  || September 24, 1960 || Palomar || PLS || — || align=right | 8.4 km || 
|-id=967 bgcolor=#fefefe
| 1967 Menzel || 1905 VC ||  || November 1, 1905 || Heidelberg || M. F. Wolf || — || align=right | 9.6 km || 
|-id=968 bgcolor=#E9E9E9
| 1968 Mehltretter || 1932 BK ||  || January 29, 1932 || Heidelberg || K. Reinmuth || — || align=right | 13 km || 
|-id=969 bgcolor=#d6d6d6
| 1969 Alain || 1935 CG ||  || February 3, 1935 || Uccle || S. Arend || — || align=right | 23 km || 
|-id=970 bgcolor=#E9E9E9
| 1970 Sumeria || 1954 ER ||  || March 12, 1954 || La Plata Observatory || M. Itzigsohn || DOR || align=right | 19 km || 
|-id=971 bgcolor=#d6d6d6
| 1971 Hagihara ||  ||  || September 14, 1955 || Brooklyn || Indiana University || EOS || align=right | 12 km || 
|-id=972 bgcolor=#fefefe
| 1972 Yi Xing ||  ||  || November 9, 1964 || Nanking || Purple Mountain Obs. || — || align=right | 6.0 km || 
|-id=973 bgcolor=#d6d6d6
| 1973 Colocolo || 1968 OA ||  || July 18, 1968 || Cerro El Roble || C. Torres, S. Cofré || — || align=right | 26 km || 
|-id=974 bgcolor=#d6d6d6
| 1974 Caupolican || 1968 OE ||  || July 18, 1968 || Cerro El Roble || C. Torres, S. Cofré || — || align=right | 12 km || 
|-id=975 bgcolor=#E9E9E9
| 1975 Pikelner || 1969 PH ||  || August 11, 1969 || Nauchnij || L. I. Chernykh || — || align=right | 15 km || 
|-id=976 bgcolor=#fefefe
| 1976 Kaverin || 1970 GC ||  || April 1, 1970 || Nauchnij || L. I. Chernykh || — || align=right | 3.7 km || 
|-id=977 bgcolor=#E9E9E9
| 1977 Shura || 1970 QY ||  || August 30, 1970 || Nauchnij || T. M. Smirnova || — || align=right | 17 km || 
|-id=978 bgcolor=#fefefe
| 1978 Patrice || 1971 LD ||  || June 13, 1971 || Bickley || Perth Obs. || — || align=right | 6.7 km || 
|-id=979 bgcolor=#fefefe
| 1979 Sakharov || 2006 P-L ||  || September 24, 1960 || Palomar || PLS || V || align=right | 4.8 km || 
|-id=980 bgcolor=#FFC2E0
| 1980 Tezcatlipoca || 1950 LA ||  || June 19, 1950 || Palomar || A. G. Wilson, Å. A. E. Wallenquist || AMO +1km || align=right | 4.3 km || 
|-id=981 bgcolor=#FFC2E0
| 1981 Midas || 1973 EA ||  || March 6, 1973 || Palomar || C. T. Kowal || APO +1kmPHA || align=right | 3.4 km || 
|-id=982 bgcolor=#fefefe
| 1982 Cline || 1975 VA ||  || November 4, 1975 || Palomar || E. F. Helin || — || align=right | 8.1 km || 
|-id=983 bgcolor=#E9E9E9
| 1983 Bok || 1975 LB ||  || June 9, 1975 || Tucson || E. Roemer || — || align=right | 16 km || 
|-id=984 bgcolor=#d6d6d6
| 1984 Fedynskij || 1926 TN ||  || October 10, 1926 || Crimea-Simeis || S. Belyavskyj || — || align=right | 36 km || 
|-id=985 bgcolor=#d6d6d6
| 1985 Hopmann || 1929 AE ||  || January 13, 1929 || Heidelberg || K. Reinmuth || — || align=right | 36 km || 
|-id=986 bgcolor=#d6d6d6
| 1986 Plaut ||  ||  || September 28, 1935 || Johannesburg || H. van Gent || THM || align=right | 20 km || 
|-id=987 bgcolor=#fefefe
| 1987 Kaplan || 1952 RH ||  || September 11, 1952 || Crimea-Simeis || P. F. Shajn || PHO || align=right | 13 km || 
|-id=988 bgcolor=#fefefe
| 1988 Delores || 1952 SV ||  || September 28, 1952 || Brooklyn || Indiana University || — || align=right | 5.8 km || 
|-id=989 bgcolor=#fefefe
| 1989 Tatry || 1955 FG ||  || March 20, 1955 || Skalnaté Pleso || A. Paroubek, R. Podstanická || slow || align=right | 9.6 km || 
|-id=990 bgcolor=#fefefe
| 1990 Pilcher || 1956 EE ||  || March 9, 1956 || Heidelberg || K. Reinmuth || — || align=right | 6.8 km || 
|-id=991 bgcolor=#fefefe
| 1991 Darwin || 1967 JL ||  || May 6, 1967 || El Leoncito || C. U. Cesco, A. R. Klemola || FLO || align=right | 5.0 km || 
|-id=992 bgcolor=#d6d6d6
| 1992 Galvarino || 1968 OD ||  || July 18, 1968 || Cerro El Roble || C. Torres, S. Cofré || — || align=right | 9.6 km || 
|-id=993 bgcolor=#d6d6d6
| 1993 Guacolda ||  ||  || July 25, 1968 || Cerro El Roble || G. A. Plyugin, Yu. A. Belyaev || — || align=right | 8.4 km || 
|-id=994 bgcolor=#E9E9E9
| 1994 Shane || 1961 TE ||  || October 4, 1961 || Brooklyn || Indiana University || ADE || align=right | 25 km || 
|-id=995 bgcolor=#E9E9E9
| 1995 Hajek ||  ||  || October 26, 1971 || Hamburg-Bergedorf || L. Kohoutek || — || align=right | 13 km || 
|-id=996 bgcolor=#E9E9E9
| 1996 Adams || 1961 UA ||  || October 16, 1961 || Brooklyn || Indiana University || MAR || align=right | 12 km || 
|-id=997 bgcolor=#fefefe
| 1997 Leverrier || 1963 RC ||  || September 14, 1963 || Brooklyn || Indiana University || FLO || align=right | 6.8 km || 
|-id=998 bgcolor=#fefefe
| 1998 Titius ||  ||  || February 24, 1938 || Heidelberg || A. Bohrmann || — || align=right | 14 km || 
|-id=999 bgcolor=#d6d6d6
| 1999 Hirayama || 1973 DR ||  || February 27, 1973 || Hamburg-Bergedorf || L. Kohoutek || — || align=right | 38 km || 
|-id=000 bgcolor=#fefefe
| 2000 Herschel || 1960 OA ||  || July 29, 1960 || Sonneberg || J. Schubart || PHOslow || align=right | 15 km || 
|}

References

External links 
 Discovery Circumstances: Numbered Minor Planets (1)–(5000) (IAU Minor Planet Center)

0001